= List of Canadian appeals to the Judicial Committee of the Privy Council, 1950–1959 =

List of Canadian appeals to the JCPC (1950–1959)

This page lists all cases of the Judicial Committee of the Privy Council originating in Canada, and decided in the years 1950 to 1959.

From 1867 to 1949, the JCPC was the highest court of appeal for Canada (and, separately, for Newfoundland). During this period, its decisions on Canadian appeals were binding precedent on all Canadian courts, including the Supreme Court of Canada. Any decisions from this era that the Supreme Court of Canada has not overruled since gaining appellate supremacy in 1949 remain good law, and continue to bind all Canadian courts other than the Supreme Court.

The Parliament of Canada abolished appeals to the JCPC of criminal cases in 1933 and civil cases in 1949. Ongoing cases that had begun before those dates remained appealable to the JCPC. The final JCPC ruling on a Canadian case was rendered in 1959, in Ponoka-Calmar Oils v Wakefield.

== Case list ==
Case name	Citation	Subject (Exact Text from Judgment)	Judges (Author of decision in bold)	Appeal Allowed or Dismissed	On Appeal from
The Executors of the Will of the Honourable Patrick Burns, Deceased, and Others v. The Minister of National Revenue	[1950] UKPC 3	"This is an appeal by the executors of the Honourable Patrick Burns deceased (who died on the 24th February, 1937) and six added parties who are interested under his will from a judgment of the Supreme Court of Canada allowing in part an appeal by the appellants from a judgment of the Exchequer Court. That judgment had dismissed an appeal by the executors from a decision of the present respondent the Minister of National Revenue, who had confirmed assessments to income tax in respect of the four years 1938 to 1941 inclusive under the provisions of the Income War Tax Act of the Dominion."	**Lord Greene**; Lord Simonds; Lord Normand; Lord Morton of Henryton; Lord Radcliffe	Appeal allowed in part	Supreme Court of Canada
Harry Reeder v. George E. Shnier & Company	[1950] UKPC 29	"This is an appeal from a judgment of the Supreme Court of Canada dismissing an appeal from the Court of Appeal of Ontario. On 23rd August, 1946, the appellant raised an action against the respondent in the Supreme Court of Ontario: he was successful before Smily J. and on 18th June, 1947, the Court of Appeal of Ontario dismissed an appeal by the respondent. Then on 8th September 1947, the respondent moved under Rule 523 of the Rules of the Supreme Court of Ontario for an order reversing this judgment on the grounds that it was 'obtained by the fraud and/or perjury of the plaintiff and/or because of matter arising subsequent to the making of said judgment'."	Lord Porter; Lord Normand; Lord Morton of Henryton; **Lord Reid**; Lord Radcliffe	Appeal allowed	Supreme Court of Canada
The Canadian Federation of Agriculture v. The Attorney-General of Quebec and others (Margarine Reference)	[1950] UKPC 31	"This is an appeal from the Supreme Court of Canada on a Reference by the Governor-General in Council dated the 27th July, 1948. The only question referred to the Supreme Court for hearing and consideration was :— 'Is Section 5 (a) of the Dairy Industry Act, R.S.C. 1927, Chapter 45, ultra vires of the Parliament of Canada either in whole or in part and if so in what particular of particulars and to what extent?' "	Lord Porter; Lord Simonds; **Lord Morton of Henryton**; Lord MacDermott; Lord Radcliffe	Appeal dismissed	Supreme Court of Canada
William R. Glover v. Albert Glover (Personal representative of Evelyn Glover now deceased)	[1950] UKPC 33	"This is an appeal by special leave from a judgment of the Supreme Court of Canada dated 24th June, 1949, which by a majority of three Judges to two reversed a judgment of the Court of Appeal for Ontario dated 27th May, 1948, which had reversed the judgment of the trial Judge (Mr. Justice Le Bel) dated 14th June, 1947, by which it was adjudged in favour of the plaintiff in the action, Evelyn Glover, that a quit claim deed dated 29th July, 1944, from her and her deceased husband, Albert Glover, to the appellant, William R. Glover, be set aside."	Lord Porter; Lord Goddard, Lord Chief Justice of England; Lord Reid; Lord Radcliffe; **Lord Tucker**	Appeal allowed	Supreme Court of Canada
Boiler Inspection and Insurance Company of Canada v. The Sherwin Williams Company of Canada Ltd.	[1951] UKPC 5	"This is an appeal by special leave from a judgment of the Supreme Court of Canada which by a majority reversed a judgment of the Court of King's Bench for the Province of Quebec; that Court having previously by a majority reversed a judgment of the Superior Court of the District of Montreal. By the judgment of the Supreme Court the appellants were ordered to pay 45,791.38 dollars with interest to the respondents."	**Lord Porter**; Lord Merriman; Lord Reid; Lord Radcliffe; Lord Tucker	Appeal dismissed	Supreme Court of Canada
Mark T. McKee v. Evelyn McKee	[1951] UKPC 9	"This appeal is brought from a judgment of the Supreme Court of Canada dated the 6th June, 1950, whereby by a majority of four judges to three (Kerwin, Estey, Locke and Cartwright, J.J., Taschereau, Kellock and Fauteux, J.J., dissenting) an appeal by the present respondent, Evelyn McKee, from a judgment of the Court of Appeal for Ontario dated the 24th June, 1948, was allowed and an Order was made that the respondent, having undertaken forthwith to return with Terry Alexander McKee, the infant son of the appellant and respondent, to the United States of America and to keep the appellant fully advised as to the infant's whereabouts, should have the custody of the infant and that the appellant should deliver the infant into her custody at the time and place mentioned in the Order."	Lord Merriman; **Lord Simonds**; Lord Morton of Henryton; Lord Radcliffe; Lord Tucker	Appeal allowed	Supreme Court of Canada
William Lloyd White and others v. Myron Kuzych	[1951] UKPC 18	"The respondent is a welder. He became a member of the Boilermakers' and Iron Shipbuilders' Union of Canada, Local No. 1 (hereinafter referred to as "the Union") in April, 1943. He has brought this action for a declaration that he has not been validly expelled from membership of the Union, but is still a member of it in good standing, and for consequential relief."	**Viscount Simon**; Lord Porter; Lord Morton of Henryton; Lord Reid; Lord Asquith of Bishopstone	Appeal allowed	British Columbia Court of Appeal
Ena Pearl Nance v. British Columbia Electric Railway Company, Limited	[1951] UKPC 19	"This is an appeal and cross-appeal from a judgment of the Court of Appeal of British Columbia (Sloan C.J., O’Halloran and Sydney Smith, JJ.A.) dated 23rd February, 1950, allowing in part an appeal from a judgment of Whittaker, J. dated the 24th June, 1949, upon the trial of an action before a Special Jury in which the appellant claimed damages in respect of the death of her husband, which occurred on 18th January, 1949, through being knocked down and instantly killed by a streetcar, driven by a motorman employed by the Respondent Company. The appellant brought the action under the Families Compensation Act (R.S. of B.C. 1948, c. 116) on her own behalf and on behalf of the children and step-children of the deceased, and alleged that her husband's death was caused by the negligence of the motorman, for which the Respondent Company was responsible. The jury so found, awarding damages of $35,000, and in the subsequent proceedings the Respondent Company's liability has been admitted."	**Viscount Simon**; Lord Porter; Lord Morton of Henryton; Lord Reid; Lord Asquith of Bishopstone	Appeal allowed	British Columbia Court of Appeal
The McKinnon Industries Ltd. v. William Wallace Walker	[1951] UKPC 21	"This appeal is brought from an Order of the Court of Appeal for Ontario which affirmed with a slight variation the judgment of the Chief Justice of the High Court dated the 15th June, 1949, whereby it was adjudged that the Appellant Company, its servants and agents be restrained from discharging from its works any substance, gas or matter in such manner or to such an extent as to occasion damage to the Respondent's property or the buildings thereon or the plants, flowers or shrubs thereupon or therein."	**Lord Simonds**; Lord Normand; Lord Oaksey; Lord Radcliffe; The Rt. Hon. Thibaudeau Rinfret, C.J.C.	Appeal dismissed	Ontario Court of Appeal
Bennett and White (Calgary) Ltd. v. Municipal District of Sugar City No. 5	[1951] UKPC 25	"The appellants are a company incorporated under the Companies Act of the Province of Alberta, and the respondents are a municipal district in that Province. By the judgment of the Supreme Court of Alberta it was declared that the assessment of the appellants for personal property made by the respondents for the year 1947 was invalid, and that assessment was quashed and set aside."	Lord Simonds; Lord Normand; **Lord Reid**; Lord Radcliffe; Lord Asquith of Bishopstone	Appeal allowed	Supreme Court of Canada
The City of Montreal v. Sun Life Co. of Canada	[1951] UKPC 28	"This case is concerned with a dispute as to the sum at which the head office of the respondent Company is to be assessed for the municipal purpose of the City of Montreal."	**Lord Porter**; Lord Normand; Lord Oaksey; Lord Reid; Lord Asquith of Bishopstone	Appeal dismissed	Supreme Court of Canada
Canada Steamship Lines Ltd v The King	[1952] UKPC 1	"It will be convenient to refer to the appellant company as 'the company' and to the respondent as 'the Crown'. This is an appeal by special leave from six judgments of the Supreme Court of Canada dated the 23rd day of June, 1950, reversing in part a like number of judgments of the Exchequer Court of Canada (Angers, J.), which had maintained Petitions of Right against the Crown for damages arising out of a disastrous fire."	Lord Porter; Lord Normand; **Lord Morton of Henryton**; Lord Asquith of Bishopstone; Lord Cohen	Appeal allowed	Supreme Court of Canada
Minerals Separation North American Corporation v. Noranda Mines, Limited	[1952] UKPC 2	The appellants are the holders of the Canadian patent No. 247,576 which expired on 10th March, 1943. On 1st March, 1943, they brought an action against the respondents claiming declarations that the patent was valid and that the respondents had infringed it, and also claiming payment of damages or an account of profits as the plaintiffs might elect. It is admitted that if the patent was valid there was infringement. The respondents' defence is that the patent was invalid.	Lord Normand; Lord Morton of Henryton; **Lord Reid**; Lord Asquith of Bishopstone; Lord Cohen	Appeal dismissed	Supreme Court of Canada
James Joseph Gray v. New Augarita Porcupine Mines Limited	[1952] UKPC 4	"This is an appeal from a judgment of the Court of Appeal for Ontario dated 3rd March, 1950, awarding damages for fraud against the appellant and directing an enquiry under a number of heads for the purpose of ascertaining those damages. The judgment of the Court of Appeal was itself made by way of variation of a judgment of McFarland J. dated 15th October, 1949, and given in the Supreme Court of Ontario, by which he had held the appellant accountable to the respondent in respect of dealings between them and had ordered the return to the respondent of several blocks of shares or their equivalent value."	Viscount Simon; Lord Porter; Lord Oaksey; **Lord Radcliffe**; Lord Asquith of Bishopstone	Appeal allowed	Ontario Court of Appeal
Robert J. McMaster and another v. Norman W. Byrne	[1952] UKPC 8	"The action was commenced by the late Harry J. McMaster on the 15th September, 1947. By his Statement of Claim McMaster claimed from the respondent who is a barrister and solicitor practising in the city of Hamilton an accounting of the profits derived by the respondent from a transaction between them relating to 1,000 shares in a company called Carleton Securities Limited."	Lord Goddard, Lord Chief Justice of England; Lord Normand; Lord Radcliffe; Lord Asquith of Bishopstone; **Lord Cohen**	Appeal allowed	Ontario Court of Appeal
The Attorney-General of Canada and another v. Hallet and Carey Limited and another	[1952] UKPC 13	"This is an appeal (by special leave) from a judgment of the Supreme Court of Canada dated the 20th of November, 1950. That judgment disposed of appeals in two separate actions which had been started in the Court of Queen's Bench for Manitoba, but the result of each action depends on the answer to the same question, whether an Order of the Governor General in Council, P.C. 1292, made on the 3rd April, 1947, was effective to vest in the appellants the Canadian Wheat Board (hereinafter referred to as 'the Board') the property in 40,000 bushels of barley belonging to the respondent Nolan."	Viscount Simon; Lord Normand; **Lord Radcliffe**; Lord Asquith of Bishopstone; Lord Cohen	Appeal allowed	Supreme Court of Canada
Marvin Sigurdson v. British Columbia Electric Railway Company Limited	[1952] UKPC 23	"On 20th November, 1948, the appellant brought an action in the Supreme Court of British Columbia claiming damages for personal injuries suffered by him on 6th August, 1948, and for damage to his motor car, by reason of the alleged negligence of the driver of a street car owned an operated by the respondent. The action was heard by Wood J. and a Common Jury and on 13th December, 1950, judgment was entered for the plaintiff for $20,688.55 and costs, the jury having found that the defendant's driver was guilty of negligence which caused the plaintiff's injuries and that the plaintiff was not guilty of negligence which contributed to the accident."	Viscount Simon; Lord Normand; Lord Oaksey; **Lord Tucker**	Appeal allowed	British Columbia Court of Appeal
Micheal Borys v. Canadian Pacific Railway Company and another	[1953] UKPC 2	"This is an appeal by Micheal Borys from a judgment of the Appellate Division of the Supreme Court of Alberta which partly reversed and partly affirmed a judgment of the Chief Justice. In the court of first instance Mr. Borys was plaintiff, and the two respondents were defendants, who not only resisted the claim but also counter claimed against him and now cross-appeal against portions of the judgment of the Appellate division.	**Lord Porter**; Lord Tucker; Lord Asquith of Bishopstone; Lord Cohen; The Rt. Hon. Thibaudeau Rinfret, C.J.C.	Appeal dismissed	Alberta Supreme Court (Appellate Division)
The Attorney General of the Province of Alberta and another v. Huggard Assets Limited and The Attorney General of Canada and others	[1953] UKPC 11	"The issue raised on this appeal is shortly whether the Crown in right of the Province of Alberta is entitled to levy certain royalties from Huggard Assets Ltd. respondents in the appeal and plaintiffs in the action, on petroleum and natural gas derived by them from a certain area in that Province."	Lord Porter; Lord Oaksey; Lord Reid; Lord Tucker; **Lord Asquith of Bishopstone**	Appeal allowed	Supreme Court of Canada
The Attorney General of the Province of Alberta v. West Canadian Collieries Limited and others	[1953] UKPC 12	"The plaintiffs were grantees or lessees of mineral lands and mining rights in the Province of Alberta (or in territories from which, in 1905, that Province was carved out). The grants and leases in question were originally made by the Crown in right of the Dominion, in which, in 1870, the parent territories had been vested. They were made under powers conferred by a series of Dominion Statutes called the Dominion Land Acts, and by Regulations and Orders in Council from time to time made in pursuance of those Acts."	Lord Porter; Lord Oaksey; Lord Reid; Lord Tucker; **Lord Asquith of Bishopstone**	Appeal dismissed	Alberta Supreme Court (Appellate Division)
The Attorney-General for Saskatchewan v. Canadian Pacific Railway Company	[1953] UKPC 19	"This is an Appeal by special leave from a judgment of the Supreme Court of Canada, dated November 20th, 1950, allowing in part an Appeal by the respondent from a judgment of the Court of Appeal for Saskatchewan dated January 29th, 1949." "The Court of Appeal had before it four questions referred to it by an Order of the Lieutenant-Governor in Council, dated November 16th, 1948, pursuant to the Constitutional Questions Act (Chapter 72 of the Revised Statutes of Saskatchewan 1940). These question involved consideration of the interpretation of Clause 16 of a contract executed on October 21st, 1880 between the Canadian Government and contractors who were to constitute the Canadian Pacific Railway Company. The contract provided for the construction, operation and maintenance of the Canadian Pacific Railway."	**Viscount Simon**; Lord Oaksey; Lord Tucker; Lord Asquith of Bishopstone; Lord Cohen	Appeal dismissed	Supreme Court of Canada
The City of Winnipeg v. Canadian Pacific Railway Company	[1953] UKPC 22	"By notices given respectively in the months of March and June, 1948, the appellant notified the respondent company that the appellant had assessed the lands and buildings owned by the respondent company in the City of Winnipeg for railway purposes or in connection therewith for realty tax and business tax respectively. Immediately after the service of the first of such notices the respondent company commenced proceedings against the appellant and after receipt of the second notice amended its statement of claim. By the amended document the respondent company claimed that all its property then owned or thereafter to be owned by it in the City of Winnipeg was forever exempt from all municipal taxes, rates and levies and assessments of every nature and kind, and in particular from any real property tax or business tax in respect of such property."	Viscount Simon; Lord Oaksey; Lord Tucker; Lord Asquith of Bishopstone; **Lord Cohen**	Appeal dismissed	Supreme Court of Canada
J. Lucien Dansereau v. Colette Berget and another –and– Fanny Irenee Gabrielle Colin v. Colette Berget and another	[1953] UKPC 27	"This is an appeal by special leave from a judgment of the Supreme Court of Canada dismissing an appeal from a judgment of the Court of King's Bench of Quebec which had set aside a judgment, dated the 5th March, 1948, of the Superior Court of Quebec.	Lord Normand; **Lord Oaksey**; Lord Tucker; Lord Asquith of Bishopstone; Lord Cohen	Appeal allowed	Supreme Court of Canada
The Attorney General for Ontario and others v. Israel Winner (doing business under the name and style of Mackenzie Coach Lines) and others	[1954] UKPC 8	"The problem with which their Lordships are confronted in the present appeal is concerned with the conflicting jurisdiction of the Parliament of Canada on the one part and on the other part of the legislation and regulations of the Province of New Brunswick made under its local acts."	**Lord Porter**; Lord Oaksey; Lord Tucker; Lord Asquith of Bishopstone; Lord Cohen	Appeal allowed	Supreme Court of Canada
Associated Broadcasting Company Limited and others v. Composers, Authors and Publishers Association of Canada Limited	[1954] UKPC 41	"The short question in this appeal, which is brought by special leave from an Order of the Court of Appeal for Ontario, is whether the appellants have infringed the copyright in certain musical works which, so far as concerns the sole right to perform those works in public throughout Canada, is vested in the respondents, The Composers, Authors and Publishers Association of Canada Limited."	**Viscount Simonds**; Lord Oaksey; Lord Reid; Lord Tucker; Lord Somervell of Harrow	Appeal dismissed	Ontario Court of Appeal
Edwin G. Baker v. National Trust Company, Limited and others –and– The Public Trustee for the Province of Ontario v. National Trust Company, Limited and others	[1955] UKPC 17	The question is whether there was by the will of the later Herbert Coplin Cox a valid charitable bequest of the residue of his estate which he directed his Trustees to hold upon trust as follows..."	Viscount Simonds, Lord Chancellor); Lord Oaksey; Lord Reid; Lord Tucker; **Lord Somervell of Harrow**	Appeal dismissed	Supreme Court of Canada
Nisbet Shipping Company Limited v. The Queen	[1955] UKPC 26	"This appeal from a decision of the Supreme Court of Canada raises a question of very great difficulty. On the 13th February, 1945, there was a collision between H.M.C.S. 'Orkney' and the 'Blairnevis' a vessel owned by the appellant company, Nisbet Shipping Company Ltd. On the 20th July, 1951, it was decided by Mr. Justice Thorson sitting as President of the Exchequer Court of Canada that 'Orkney' was alone to blame for the collision and that the respondent was not entitled to limit liability under the provisions of the Canada Shipping Act, 1934."	**Viscount Simonds**; Lord Oaksey; Lord Radcliffe; Lord Tucker; Lord Cohen	Appeal allowed	Supreme Court of Canada
William D. Branson Limited v. Furness (Canada) Limited (In Liquidation)	[1955] UKPC 28	"In July 1948 the appellants sued the respondents in the Exchequer Court of Canada for damages in respect of their failure to carry and deliver in good order and condition in their vessel the s.s. 'Fort Columbia' a cargo of potatoes shipped by the appellants in November 1947 for carriage from Halifax, N.S. to Rio de Janeiro under three bills of lading issued by the respondents which provided for delivery of the goods to the order of the appellants."	Viscount Simonds; Lord Oaksey; Lord Radcliffe; **Lord Tucker**; Lord Cohen	Appeal allowed	Supreme Court of Canada
The Minister of National Revenue v. Anaconda American Brass Limited	[1955] UKPC 36	This appeal from a judgment of the Supreme Court of Canada which dismissed an appeal from a judgment of the President of the Exchequer Court of Canada raises a question of novelty and importance. The appellant is the Minister of National Revenue, the respondent a limited company, Anaconda American Brass Limited.	**Viscount Simonds**; Lord Oaksey; Lord Reid; Lord Keith of Avonholm; Lord Somervell of Harrow	Appeal allowed	Supreme Court of Canada
Maxine Footwear Company Limited and another v. Canadian Government Merchant Marine Limited	[1959] UKPC 13	"This is an appeal from a judgment of the Supreme Court of Canada (Kerwin, C.J., Tashchereau, Fauteux and Abbott, J.J., Cartwright, J., dissenting) dated 1st October, 1957, dismissing an appeal from a judgment of the Exchequer Court of Canada (Cameron, J.) which in turn had dismissed an appeal from a judgment of the Admiralty Court for the District of Quebec (Arthur I. Smith, J.) whereby the appellants' action as shippers against the respondents as carriers for non-delivery of their goods was dismissed.	Viscount Kilmuir, Lord Chancellor; Lord Reid; Lord Tucker; **Lord Somervell of Harrow**; Lord Denning	Appeal allowed	Supreme Court of Canada
Ponoka-Calmar Oils Ltd. and another v. Earl F. Wakefield Co., and others	[1959] UKPC 20	"This appeal from a judgment of the Supreme Court of Canada raises questions of some difficulty upon the true construction of the Mechanics’ Lien Act and in particular upon its application, where the lien alleged to arise under it attaches not only to certain land including the oil and gas therein but also to the oil and gas when severed, and where it is sought to enforce it against a fund representing the proceeds of sale of such oil and gas which have been realised by a receiver appointed by the Court under the Act."	**Viscount Simonds**; Lord Reid; Lord Radcliffe; Lord Tucker; Lord Denning	Appeal dismissed	Supreme Court of Canada

== Summary by year and result ==
Year	Number of Cases	Appeal Allowed		Appeal Dismissed	
1950	4	3	75.0%	1	25.0%
1951	7	4	57.1%	3	42.9%
1952	6	5	83.3%	1	16.7%
1953	6	2	33.3%	4	66.7%
1954	2	1	50.0%	1	50.0%
1955	4	3	75.0%	1	25.0%
1956	0	0	0.0%	0	0.0%
1957	0	0	0.0%	0	0.0%
1958	0	0	0.0%	0	0.0%
1959	2	1	50.0%	1	50.0%
Total Cases	31	19	61.3%	12	38.7%
Yearly Averages	3.1	1.9		1.2	

== Summary by jurisdiction and court appealed from ==
Jurisdiction	Number of Cases	On Appeal from Supreme Court of Canada		On Appeal from Other Courts	
Federal	8	8	100.0%	0	0.0%
Ontario	8	4	50.0%	4	50.0%
Quebec	3	3	100.0%	0	0.0%
Nova Scotia	0	0	0.0%	0	0.0%
New Brunswick	1	1	100.0%	0	0.0%
Manitoba	2	2	100.0%	0	0.0%
British Columbia	3	3	100.0%	0	0.0%
Prince Edward Island	0	0	0.0%	0	0.0%
Saskatchewan	1	1	100.0%	0	0.0%
Alberta	5	3	60.0%	2	40.0%
Newfoundland	0	0	0.0%	0	0.0%
North-West Territories	0	0	0.0%	0	0.0%
Yukon	0	0	0.0%	0	0.0%
Total	31	25	80.6%	6	19.4%

== See also ==
- List of Canadian appeals to the Judicial Committee of the Privy Council, 1867–1869
- List of Canadian appeals to the Judicial Committee of the Privy Council, 1870–1879
- List of Canadian appeals to the Judicial Committee of the Privy Council, 1880–1889
- List of Canadian appeals to the Judicial Committee of the Privy Council, 1890–1899
- List of Canadian appeals to the Judicial Committee of the Privy Council, 1900–1909
- List of Canadian appeals to the Judicial Committee of the Privy Council, 1910–1919
- List of Canadian appeals to the Judicial Committee of the Privy Council, 1920–1929
- List of Canadian appeals to the Judicial Committee of the Privy Council, 1930–1939
- List of Canadian appeals to the Judicial Committee of the Privy Council, 1940–1949

== Sources ==
- British and Irish Legal Information Institute: Privy Council Decisions
- 1950 Privy Council Decisions
- 1951 Privy Council Decisions
- 1952 Privy Council Decisions
- 1953 Privy Council Decisions
- 1954 Privy Council Decisions
- 1955 Privy Council Decisions
- 1956 Privy Council Decisions
- 1957 Privy Council Decisions
- 1958 Privy Council Decisions
- 1959 Privy Council Decisions
