= List of Canadian appeals to the Judicial Committee of the Privy Council, 1920–1929 =

List of Canadian appeals to JCPC (1920–1929)

This page lists all cases of the Judicial Committee of the Privy Council originating in Canada, and decided in the years 1920 to 1929.

From 1867 to 1949, the JCPC was the highest court of appeal for Canada (and, separately, for Newfoundland). During this period, its decisions on Canadian appeals were binding precedent on all Canadian courts, including the Supreme Court of Canada. Any decisions from this era that the Supreme Court of Canada has not overruled since gaining appellate supremacy in 1949 remain good law, and continue to bind all Canadian courts other than the Supreme Court.

The Parliament of Canada abolished appeals to the JCPC of criminal cases in 1933 and civil cases in 1949. Ongoing cases that had begun before those dates remained appealable to the JCPC. The final JCPC ruling on a Canadian case was rendered in 1959, in Ponoka-Calmar Oils v Wakefield.

== Cases ==
Case name	Citation	Subject (Exact Text from Judgment)	Judges (Author of decision in bold)	Appeal allowed or dismissed?	On appeal from
Toronto Railway Company v. The Corporation of the City of Toronto	[1920] UKPC 1	"This is an appeal from the judgment of the Ontario Supreme Court (Appellate Division) dated the 20th December, 1918, confirming an order of the Ontario Railway and Municipal Board dated the 19th April, 1918, which ordered the appellants to pay to the respondents the sum of $24,000. The appellants, the Toronto Railway Company, are the holders of an exclusive franchise to operate street railways in the city of Toronto for a period of thirty years from the 1st September, 1891."	Viscount Finlay; **Viscount Cave**; Lord Shaw	Appeal allowed	Ontario Supreme Court (Appellate Division)
Toronto Railway Company v. The Corporation of the City of Toronto	[1920] UKPC 2	"The question in this case has reference to the removal of snow which falls on the lines of a street railway which runs through the city of Toronto. The judgments of the Court below have affirmed the liability of the appellants, the Railway Company, for the cost of the removal by the respondents, the city, of snow swept by the appellants form the tracks of their railway on to the solum of the streets on the side of the tracks."	Viscount Finlay; Viscount Cave; **Lord Shaw**	Appeal dismissed	Ontario Supreme Court (Appellate Division)
The Quebec Railway Light Heat and Power Company Limited v. G.A. Vandry and other	[1920] UKPC 8	"The principal object of this appeal is to settle the true construction of Article 1054 of the Civil Code of Lower Canada."	Viscount Cave; Lord Shaw; **Lord Sumner**; Lord Parmoor	Appeal dismissed	Supreme Court of Canada
The Montreal Tramways Company v. Peter McAllister	[1920] UKPC 16	"The respondent in this case, Peter McAllister, is the guardian and father of Francis McAllister, and sues the appellants, the Montreal Tramways Company, for damage for personal injury to Francis McAllister. The facts are simple enough. Francis McAllister is a schoolboy, and with other school companions he was, on the 7th November, 1913, going to the grounds of the Montreal Amateur Athletics Association, which are situated on the south side of the appellants' tramway lines."	Viscount Haldane; Lord Buckmaster; **Lord Dunedin**	Appeal dismissed	Quebec Court of King's Bench (Appeal Side)
Rederiakatiebolaget Navigator v. Edmund L. Newcombe, K.C., C.M.G., the Proper Officer of the Crown	[1920] UKPC 26	"Their Lordships are much indebted to Counsel on both sides for the unusually complete and exhaustive survey of all possible authorities bearing on a most important question, but, for reasons which their Lordships will briefly state, they do not think it necessary to deal with this case in such a manner as would require that time should be taken for its further consideration."	**Lord Sumner**; Lord Parmoor; Lord Wrenbury; The Lord Justice Clerk (Lord Dickson); Sir Arthur Channell	Appeal allowed	Exchequer Court of Canada
The Ship 'Imo' v. La Compagnie Générale Transatlantique	[1920] UKPC 27	"La Compagnie Générale Transatlantique, a French Company, are the owners of a ship named the 'Mont Blanc'. The Southern Pacific Whaling Company, Limited, are the owners of a ship named the 'Imo'. On the 6th December, 1917, at about 8.45 in the morning, these two vessels collided in the harbour of Halifax, Nova Scotia. The 'Imo' was outward bound in ballast, the 'Mont Blanc' inward bound, heavily laden with high explosives. By the collision the 'Mont Blanc' was set on fire. Her cargo ultimately exploded with the most disastrous results. Many persons, including the Captain, Chief Officer, and the highly-skilled pilot of the 'Imo,' were killed, a portion of the city of Halifax wrecked, and the ship herself blown into pieces."	Present at the Hearing: Viscount Haldane; Lord Dunedin; **Lord Atkinson**; The Lord Justice Clerk (Lord Dickson) Nautical Assessors: Admiral Sir R. Nelson Ommanney, K.B.E; Commander Carborne, C.B., R.N.R	Appeal dismissed	Supreme Court of Canada
The City of Montreal v. Elphége Dufresne	[1920] UKPC 62	"In 1912 and 1913 the City of Montreal had in view a municipal improvement, consisting in the extension of the Rue du Palais, or Boulevard St. Joseph, in the Quartier St. Denis of the City, for which it was necessary to acquire a considerable amount of land then in private hands."	Viscount Haldane; Lord Moulton; **Lord Sumner**; Lord Parmoor	Appeal dismissed	Quebec Superior Court
The City of Quebec v. Ludger Bastien	[1920] UKPC 69	"The actual field of controversy in the argument at the Bar in this appeal turned out to lie within narrow limits. The only question that really arose proved to be whether the appellants, in exercising a statutory power which undoubtedly entitled them to do what they actually have done, could do it without paying for the damage they have inflicted."	**Viscount Haldane**; Viscount Cave; Lord Dunedin; Lord Atkinson; Mr. Justice Duff	Appeal dismissed	Quebec Court of King's Bench (Appeal Side)
Joseph Paquet and another v. The Corporation of Pilots for and below the harbour of Quebec	[1920] UKPC 74	"In this case the Attorney-General for the Dominion of Canada has been made a co-appellant as the appeal raises questions in which the Dominion Government has a direct interest. In 1917 the respondent Corporation brought the action out of which the appeal arises, in the Superior Court of the Province of Quebec, against a pilot named Paquet who was one of the members of the Corporation, to recover a sum of about $532, being the amount earned by him for services as a pilot of the Harbour of Quebec."	**Viscount Haldane**; Viscount Cave; Lord Dunedin; Lord Atkinson; Mr. Justice Duff	Appeal allowed	Quebec Court of King's Bench (Appeal Side)
The King v. Paul A. Paulson and others	[1920] UKPC 78	"This is an appeal by special leave from a judgment of the Supreme Court of Canada, dated the 29th December, 1915, which reversed a judgment dated the 15th April, 1914, of the Exchequer Court of Canada by which latter judgment it had been declared that a lease, dated the 8th August, 1904, granted by the Crown to first-named respondent had been forfeited or cancelled and set aside."	Viscount Haldane; Lord Buckmaster; Viscount Cave; Lord Dunedin; **Lord Atkinson**	Appeal dismissed	Supreme Court of Canada
Frederick Lampson v. The City of Quebec	[1920] UKPC 80	"The point for decision in this appeal is very short one, although it has given rise to considerable division of judicial opinion. The facts too are comparatively few and simple. The appellant and his late brother, Georges Lampson, deceased (of whom the appellant is the universal legatee), by two emphyteutic leases, both dated the 22nd March, 1888, demised to one Claude Giguère each of two plots of ground respectively in Champlain Ward in the City of Quebec, each for a term of twenty-five years from 30th April, 1888, at a rent in each case of 25 dollars per annum, payable half-yearly on the 1st May and 1st November in each year. Each lease contained two covenants by the lessee: first that he would build a good house with brick or stone chimney within two years from the date of the lease, and keep the same in order and repair during the term of the lease; and secondly that he would at the end of the lease give up the rented premises to the lessor in good order and repair together with all improvements."	Viscount Haldane; Viscount Cave; Lord Dunedin; **Lord Atkinson**	Appeal allowed	Supreme Court of Canada
The City of Montreal v. La Corporation du Collège Sainte Marie à Montréal	[1920] UKPC 81	"The questions in controversy on this appeal concern the legality and effect of a resolution of the Municipal Council of the town of Maisonneuve of the 26th January, 1898, by which the Council professed to fix the amount payable annually as taxes for thirty years by the respondents in respect of certain lands within the municipality at the sum of $100. The town of Maisonneuve by its action prayed a declaration that the resolution was void, and claimed the sum of $7,628 alleged to be due as arrears of taxes upon this property."	Viscount Haldane; Viscount Cave; Lord Dunedin; Lord Atkinson; **Mr. Justice Duff**	Appeal dismissed	Quebec Court of King's Bench (Appeal Side)
Les Président et Syndics de la Commune de Laprairie de la Magdeleine v. La Compagnie de Jésus	[1920] UKPC 83	"This is an appeal from a judgment of the Court of King's Bench (Appeal Side) for the Province of Quebec rendered under the Act 3, George V (Quebec) c. 78, whereby it was provided that the respective rights of the respondents, the Society of Jesus, and of the persons having rights in the Laprairie common in the Province of Quebec should be determined by that Court subject to the appeal provided by law."	Viscount Haldane; **Viscount Cave**; Lord Dunedin; Lord Atkinson; Mr. Justice Duff	Appeal allowed in part	Quebec Court of King's Bench (Appeal Side)
Curtis's and Harvey (Canada) Limited in liquidation and another v. The North British and Mercantile Insurance Company Limited and another	[1920] UKPC 84; [1920] UKPC 85	"Though this is an important case, both in respect of the amount which is at stake and from the fact that it has given rise to a difference of judicial opinion, yet the facts out of which the questions arises are capable of being set forth with great succinctness. The appellants in the first of these appeals are manufacturers of explosives and are the owners of works in which such explosives are made, and in particular, they were engaged in the manufacture of Tri-Nitro-Toluol. They wished to insure their works against fire, and through their brokers they sent to the respondents, the North British and Mercantile Insurance Company, a slip on which was typewritten their requirements for insurance."	Viscount Haldane; Viscount Cave; **Lord Dunedin**; Lord Atkinson; Mr. Justice Duff	Appeal allowed in part	Quebec Court of King's Bench (Appeal Side)
The Attorney-General for the Province of Quebec and others v. The Attorney-General for the Dominion of Canada and another	[1920] UKPC 96	"By an order of the Governor of the late Province of Canada in Council, of the 9th August, 1853, pursuant to a statute of that province (14 and 15 Vict. c. 106), the provisions of which are hereinafter explained, certain lands, including those whose title is in question on this appeal, viz., Lots 6, 7 and 8, in the thirteenth range of the township of Coleraine in the county of Megantic, were appropriated for the benefit of the Indian tribes of Lower Canada, those particularly mentioned being set apart for the tribe called the Abenakis of Becancour. By an instrument of surrender of the 14th February, 1882, which was accepted by an order of the Governor-General of Canada in Council of the 3rd April, 1882, this tribe surrendered (inter alia) the lots above specified to Her Majesty the Queen; and on the 2nd July, 1887, the Dominion government professed to grant them by letters patent to Cyrice Tetu, of Montreal, whose interest in them passed on his death to Dame Caroline Tetu."	Viscount Haldane; Viscount Cave; Lord Dunedin; **Mr. Justice Duff**	Appeal allowed	Quebec Court of King's Bench (Appeal Side)
The Attorney-General for the Dominion of Canada v. The Attorney-General for the Province of Quebec and others	[1920] UKPC 98	"The controversy in this case arises over the answers to certain questions relating to the right of fishing in the tidal waters of the Provinces of Quebec. These questions were submitted to the Court of King's Bench of the Province by the Lieutenant-Governor in Council, who so submitted them under authority conferred on him by a statute of Quebec."	**Viscount Haldane**; Viscount Cave; Lord Dunedin; Lord Atkinson; Mr. Justice Duff	Appeal allowed	Quebec Court of King's Bench (Appeal Side)
The Pacific Coast Coal Mines, Limited, and others v. John Arbuthnot and others	[1920] UKPC 109	"The matters for decision in the present appeal arise out of the order made by His Majesty in Council on the 8th August, 1917, on an appeal from the Court of Appeal of British Columbia in an action brought by the Pacific Coast Coal Mines, Ltd., and others against John Arbuthnot and others."	Viscount Cave; **Lord Moulton**; Lord Phillimore	Appeal allowed in part	British Columbia Court of Appeal
Meredith Rowntree v J. and L. M. Ward	[1920] UKPC 117	"The appellant sued for the price of 925 common shares of the Guardian Realty Company, Limited, of Canada, which he purported to have sold to the defendants at $15 per share."	Viscount Haldane; Viscount Cave; **Lord Sumner**; Lord Parmoor	Appeal dismissed	Ontario Supreme Court (Appellate Division)
Raymond Van Hemelryck v. The William Lyall Shipbuilding Company, Limited	[1921] UKPC 8	On the 20th March, 1919, the respondents obtained leave ex party from the Chief Justice of the Supreme Court of British Columbia to issue and serve against the appellant out of the jurisdiction notice of a writ claiming damages for breach of a contract alleged to have been entered into by them with the appellant for the sale and delivery to him of six sailing vessels.	**Lord Buckmaster**; Lord Dunedin; Lord Shaw	Appeal dismissed	British Columbia Court of Appeal
Malvina Despatie v. Napoléon Tremblay	[1921] UKPC 20	"This is an appeal from a decision of the Superior Court of the Province of Quebec, sitting in Review, confirming with a slight modification the decision of the Superior Court, and its directly raises a point of great importance relating to the marriage laws of that Province."	Viscount Birkenhead, Lord Chancellor; Viscount Haldane; Viscount Cave; Lord Dunedin; **Lord Moulton**	Appeal allowed	Quebec Superior Court (Review)
The Great West Saddlery Company Limited and other v. The King	[1921] UKPC 27	"In this case their Lordships are called on to interpret and apply the implication of a judgment, delivered by the Judicial Committee on the 2nd November, 1914, in John Deere Plow Company v. Wharton, and reported in 1915 A.C. 330. It was then laid down that the British North America Act of 1867 had so enabled the parliament of the Dominion to prescribe the extent of the powers of companies incorporated under Dominion law with objects which extended to the Dominion generally, that the status and powers so far as there in question of one of the three Appellant Companies could not as matter of principle be validly interfered with by the provincial legislature of British Columbia."	**Viscount Haldane**; Viscount Cave; Lord Sumner; Lord Parmoor	Appeal dismissed	Ontario Supreme Court (Appellate Division)
The Canadian Pacific Wine Company, Limited v. Charles F. Tuley and others	[1921] UKPC 89	"This is an appeal from a judgment of the Court of Appeal of British Columbia, which affirmed the judgment of the Trial Judge Murphy J. delivered in the Supreme Court. The action was brought for the return of moveable property of the appellants, including books and papers and a stock of liquor, alleged to have been illegally seized, and for damages for such seizure and for unlawful entry into the appellants' warehouse. The respondents, excepting the respondent South, who is a Deputy Police Magistrate, are police officers of the City of Vancouver."	**Viscount Birkenhead, Lord Chancellor**; Viscount Haldane; Lord Buckmaster; Lord Carson; Sir Louis Davies, C.J.C.	Appeal dismissed	British Columbia Court of Appeal
Dame Margaret Bain v. The Central Vermont Railway Company and others	[1921] UKPC 90	"Hedges, a locomotive fireman in the employment of the Grand Trunk Railway Company, was killed in the course of his duties at Montreal on the 2nd February, 1915, by being run into by another engine driven by an engineer called Frost. It is admitted that Frost was guilty of negligence. Frost was in the service of the Central Vermont Railway Company.	Viscount Haldane; Viscount Cave; **Lord Dunedin**; Lord Atkinson; Lord Shaw	Appeal dismissed	Supreme Court of Canada
Omfroy De Beaujeu and others v. Casimir Dessaulles and others	[1921] UKPC 92	"Having regard to what has taken place their Lordships do not think it necessary to give their reasons for the advice they propose to tender to the Sovereign. They will humbly advise His Majesty that this appeal ought to be allowed and the judgments of both the Courts below set aside, and in lieu thereof that it ought to be declared that the agreement of the 30th April, 1910, so far as it authorised the respondents Casimir Dessaulles and James Domville to retain as remuneration for their services any surplus over $200,000 of the purchase-money to be obtained by the sale of the property mentioned in the agreement, is not binding on the appellants or on the estate of Madame de Beaujeu and ought to be set aside."	**Viscount Haldane**; Viscount Cave; Lord Carson; Mr. Justice Duff	Appeal allowed	Quebec Superior Court
The Corporation of the City of Victoria v. The Bishop of Vancouver	[1921] UKPC 93	"This is an appeal from the judgment of the Court of Appeal of British Columbia, dated the 15th September, 1920, allowing an appeal from the judgment, dated 28th November, 1919, of the Trial Judge, Mr. Justice Macdonald by which latter judgment the respondent's action was dismissed and the appellants given judgment on their counter-claim."	Viscount Cave; Lord Dunedin; **Lord Atkinson**; Lord Shaw; Lord Phillimore	Appeal dismissed	British Columbia Court of Appeal
The Matamajaw Salmon Club v. Thadee Duchaine, since deceased	[1921] UKPC 94	"This is an appeal from a judgment of the Supreme Court of Canada which reversed (by a majority consisting of Anglin, Brodeur and Mignault, JJ., Idington and Cassels, JJ., dissenting) a judgment of the Court of King's Bench of Quebec, affirming a judgment of the Superior Court. The question to be decided relates to the title of the appellant Club to the fishing rights in a stretch of the Matapedia river opposite to a certain piece of land on one of its banks, and to the bed of the river itself at that place."	**Viscount Haldane**; Lord Buckmaster; Lord Parmoor; Lord Carson; Sir Louis Davies, C.J.C.	Appeal allowed	Supreme Court of Canada
Dame Gertrude M. O’Meara and another v. Dame Constance Edith Bennett and others	[1921] UKPC 96	"The question in this appeal relates to the ownership of 130 preferred shares and 33 ordinary shares of the capital stock of the Corby Distillery Company, Limited, who are the second respondents. The shares are claimed by the appellant Mrs. O’Meara (hereinafter called the appellant) by virtue of a gift alleged to have been made in her favour by Mrs. Mary M. Thomas who was the rightful holder of the shares; this claim is disputed by the first respondent, Mrs. Constance Edith Bennett, who claims as a beneficiary under the Will of Mrs. Thomas, the remaining respondents, the Royal Trust Company, being the executors of the Will.	Viscount Haldane; **Lord Buckmaster**; Lord Carson; Sir Louis Davies, C.J.C.	Appeal dismissed	Quebec Court of King's Bench (Appeal Side)
The Royal Trust Company v. The Minister of Finance of British Columbia	[1921] UKPC 102	"This appeal raises a question as to the construction of the Succession Duty Act of British Columbia. By Section 5 of the Succession Duty Act of 1907 (being Chapter 217 of the Revised Statutes of 1911) all property of a deceased person, whether domiciled in the Province or not, which is situated within the Province, is made subject on his death to succession duty, the rate of duty being fixed by Sections 7 to 9 of the Act."	Viscount Haldane; **Viscount Cave**; Lord Parmoor; Lord Carson; Sir Robert Stout, C.J.N.Z.	Appeal allowed	Supreme Court of Canada
In the Matter of the Board of Commerce Act and the Combines and Fair Prices Act, 1919	[1921] UKPC 107	"This is an appeal from the Supreme Court of Canada, before which were brought, under statute, questions relating to the constitutional validity of the Acts above mentioned. As the six judges who sat in the Supreme Court were equally divided in opinion, no judgment was rendered."	**Viscount Haldane**; Lord Buckmaster; Viscount Cave; Lord Phillimore; Lord Carson	Appeal dismissed	Supreme Court of Canada
The Esquimalt and Nanaimo Railway Company v. Elizabeth Dunlop and others	[1921] UKPC 112	"This appeal arises out of two actions brought by the appellant company to establish its title to certain lands granted to the respondent, Elizabeth Dunlop, under the authority of the Vancouver Island Settlers' Rights Act of 1904 and the amending Act of 1917; and presents the same questions of law as those already decided in Wilson and McKenzies’ appeals (Nos. 43 and 44 of 1921) and was argued with it."	Viscount Haldane; Viscount Cave; Lord Carson; **Mr. Justice Duff**; Sir Robert Stout, C.J.N.Z.	Appeal dismissed	British Columbia Court of Appeal
Charles Wilson and others v. The Esquimalt and Nanaimo Railway Company	[1921] UKPC 113	"This is an appeal from the judgment of the British Columbia Court of Appeal of the 3rd February, 1921, affirming the judgment of the Trial Judge, Mr. Justice Gregory, in favour of the respondent company in which their Lordships have to consider the effect of the Vancouver Island Settlers' Rights Act of 1904 and the amending Act of 1917 that was subsequently disallowed, and well as the effect of that disallowance upon the rights of the grantees under Crown grants issued by authority of those enactments."	Viscount Haldane; Viscount Cave; Lord Carson; **Mr. Justice Duff**; Sir Robert Stout, C.J.N.Z.	Appeal dismissed	British Columbia Court of Appeal
G.H. Burland and others v. The King	[1921] UKPC 116	"The British North America Act of 1867, in sections that have been the subject of much criticism and explanation, defined and apportioned as between each province and the Dominion of Canada, the various powers of taxation that each element of the Constitution was to exercise and enjoy. With regard to the provinces, the powers were conferred by Section 92 in words which had the appearance of simplicity, and by these exclusive power was given to the provinces to make laws for 'Direct taxation within the province in order to the raising of a revenue for provincial purposes.' "	Viscount Haldane; Lord Buckmaster; Viscount Cave; **Lord Phillimore**; Lord Carson	Appeal allowed	Quebec Court of King's Bench (Appeal Side)
Dame Margaret Alleyn and others v. Ulric Barthe	[1921] UKPC 117	"The British North America Act of 1867, in sections that have been the subject of much criticism and explanation, defined and apportioned as between each province and the Dominion of Canada, the various powers of taxation that each element of the Constitution was to exercise and enjoy. With regard to the provinces, the powers were conferred by Section 92 in words which had the appearance of simplicity, and by these exclusive power was given to the provinces to make laws for 'Direct taxation within the province in order to the raising of a revenue for provincial purposes.' "	Viscount Haldane; Lord Buckmaster; Viscount Cave; **Lord Phillimore**; Lord Carson	Appeal dismissed	Quebec Court of King's Bench (Appeal Side)
The Canada Cement Company, Limited v. La Ville de Montréal Est	[1921] UKPC 130	"By Section 5733 of the Cities' and Towns' Act of Quebec, 1909, it is provided that :— 'The payment of municipal taxes may be claimed by an action brought in the name of the corporation, before the Magistrate's Court, or the Circuit Court for the county or district, or before the Mayor, or two or more councillors acting ex officio as justices of the peace, or before the Recorder's Court if there be one.' "	**Lord Buckmaster**; Lord Atkinson; Lord Sumner; Lord Wrenbury; Lord Carson	Appeal dismissed	Quebec Court of King's Bench (Appeal Side)
Sydney S. Forbes v. Jean K. Git and others	[1921] UKPC 131	"The appellant is a building contractor. The respondents are restaurant keepers, who may be called the building owners. The question on the appeal is as to the construction of a contract between these parties for works of alteration, construction and fitting up in a restaurant and public dining-room on the first floor over 119½, King Street East, in the city of Hamilton."	Lord Buckmaster; Lord Atkinson; Lord Sumner; **Lord Wrenbury**; Lord Carson	Appeal allowed	Supreme Court of Canada
The Attorney General of Manitoba v. Kelly and others	[1922] UKPC 7	"The appellant, the Attorney General of the Province of Manitoba, brought an action against the respondents, asking to have set aside a certain building contract which had been entered into between the respondents and the Province of Manitoba, for the erection of buildings in the City of Winnipeg; for the return of certain moneys alleged to have been improperly received; damages and other relief incident thereto."	Lord Atkinson; Lord Sumner; **Lord Parmoor**; Lord Wrenbury; Lord Phillimore	Appeal allowed	Manitoba Court of Appeal
Neil F. Mackay v. The Attorney-General of British Columbia and others	[1922] UKPC 17	"This appeal arises out of proceedings taken in the Supreme Court of British Columbia in order to enforce an award. The appellant alleges an agreement, expressed to have been made between the King in right of the Province, represented and acting by the Minister of Public Works, and the appellant, dated the 23rd August, 1916, under which certain lands in the City of Vancouver, on the recital that the Lieutenant-Governor in Council of the Province had deemed it necessary to acquire them, were contracted to be sold by the appellant to the Sovereign, at a price to be determined by arbitration."	**Viscount Haldane**; Viscount Cave; Lord Dunedin; Lord Shaw; Lord Phillimore	Appeal dismissed	British Columbia Court of Appeal
Foley Brothers and others v. James A McIlwee and others	[1922] UKPC 18	"On the 5th November, 1918 an interlocutory judgment was delivered on this appeal, referring the matter back to the Supreme Court of British Columbia to answer an elaborate enquiry and to take an account, and the further consideration of the appeal was adjourned until the enquiry had been answered and the account had been taken. The parties have now settled all matters in dispute between them, so their Lordships will humbly advise His Majesty that no further order on the appeal is necessary."	**Viscount Cave**; Lord Shaw; Lord Sumner	Parties Settled Before Judgment	British Columbia Court of Appeal
Alarie Joseph Seguin v. Anna Theresa Boyle	[1922] UKPC 24	"This is an appeal from a judgment of the British Columbia Court of Appeal. It was dated the 1st March, 1921, and it affirmed a judgment of the Territorial Court of the Yukon Territory (Macaulay J.) dated the 11th May, 1920, whereby it was ordered that a writ of mandamus should issue commanding the appellant, as Mining Recorder for the Dawson Mining District, to accept the application of the respondent in this appeal for 'a grant of Creek Placer Mining Claim No. 3 on Crofton Gulch, in the said Dawson Mining District, Yukon Territory, ... ' "	Viscount Haldane; Viscount Cave; Lord Dunedin; **Lord Shaw**; Lord Phillimore	Appeal allowed	British Columbia Court of Appeal (on appeal from Yukon Territorial Court)
The King v. Nat Bell Liquors, Limited	[1922] UKPC 35	"On the 7th October, 1920, an information was laid at Edmonton, Alberta, against the respondents, Nat Bell Liquors, Limited, before a magistrate of that province, charging them with unlawfully keeping for sale a quantity of liquor contrary to the Liquor Act, that is to say for sale within the province."	Lord Buckmaster; Lord Atkinson; **Lord Sumner**; Lord Wrenbury; Lord Carson	Appeal allowed as against the Alberta Supreme Court (Appellate Division); dismissed as against the Supreme Court of Canada	Separate appeals from the Supreme Court of Canada and from the Alberta Supreme Court (Appellate Division)
The Sisters of Charity of Rockingham v. The King	[1922] UKPC 59	"This appeal raises an important point as to the right of the appellants to claim compensation on the ground that a portion of their property, which has not been taken for the construction of public works, has been 'injuriously affected' by the construction of a railway shunting yard, which in part extends over lands which have been taken from them under statutory powers."	Lord Buckmaster; Lord Atkinson; Lord Sumner; **Lord Parmoor**	Appeal allowed	Supreme Court of Canada
Maurice Day Baldwin v. Mary A. M. Baldwin	[1922] UKPC 62	"Their Lordships do not think it is necessary to call upon the respondent in this case." "The proceedings are brought under Articles 189 and 190 of the Civil Code of Quebec. Under Article 189 a husband and wife may respectively demand a separation on the ground of outrage, ill-usage or grievous insult, ..."	**Viscount Haldane**; Viscount Cave; Mr. Justice Duff	Appeal dismissed	Quebec Court of King's Bench (Appeal Side)
The Royal Trust Company v. The Canadian Pacific Railway Company	[1922] UKPC 73	"The appellant is the administrator of the estate of the late William John Chambers, who was killed in a railway accident on the line of the respondents."	Viscount Haldane; Viscount Cave; **Lord Parmoor**; Mr. Justice Duff	Appeal allowed	Alberta Supreme Court (Appellate Division)
Dame Susannah H. Swan, since deceased, and others v. The Eastern Townships Bank	[1922] UKPC 76	"It will be convenient, before dealing with the questions which remain in this long and complicated litigation, in the first place to state what their Lordships take the salient features in its history to be." "In the autumn of 1882 the respondent bank was a creditor of the Pioneer Beetroot Sugar Company, which carried on business in the Province of Quebec, for about $40,000."	**Viscount Haldane**; Viscount Cave; Lord Dunedin; Mr. Justice Duff	Appeal allowed	Quebec Court of King's Bench (Appeal Side)
City of Montreal v. Watt and Scott Limited	[1922] UKPC 77	"The City of Montreal by its charter was empowered to construct and did construct a sewerage system. One of its sewers ran along Commissioners Street, on which the premises of the respondents are situated."	Viscount Haldane; Viscount Cave; **Lord Dunedin**; Lord Parmoor; Lord Phillimore	Appeal dismissed	Supreme Court of Canada
Point Anne Quarries Limited v. The Ship "M.F. Whalen"	[1922] UKPC 78	"This is a suit in rem brought in the Toronto Admiralty District of the Exchequer Court of Canada, claiming damages for the loss of a scow with her cargo of stone in Lake Ontario, on the 13th November, 1920, owing to her abandonment two days before by the tug sued, the 'M.F. Whalen'."	Viscount Cave; Lord Parmoor; **Lord Phillimore**; Lord Justice Clerk	Dismissed	Supreme Court of Canada
Geoffrey Teignmouth Clarkson and another v. E.C. Davies and others	[1922] UKPC 79	"The transactions which gave occasion for two actions in which these appeals have been taken originated and were completed in 1902. The two actions were raised one on the 6th August, 1919, and the other on the 15th March, 1920, after an interval of seventeen or eighteen years subsequent to the occurrence of the cause of action."	Viscount Cave; Lord Phillimore; Lord Justice Clerk; Mr. Justice Duff	Appeal dismissed	Ontario Supreme Court (Appellate Division)
Edith May Walpole v. The Canadian Northern Railway Company	[1922] UKPC 81	"This is an appeal from a judgment of the Court of Appeal for the Province of Saskatchewan affirming the judgment of the Court of King's Bench for the same Province, whereby judgment was entered for the respondents in an action brought by the appellant for damages under the Fatal Accidents Act of the Province."	**Viscount Cave**; Lord Parmoor; Lord Phillimore; Lord Justice Clerk; Mr. Justice Duff	Appeal dismissed	Saskatchewan Court of Appeal
Harold Eaton McMillan v. The Canadian Northern Railway Company	[1922] UKPC 82	"This is an appeal from a judgment of the Court of Appeal of Saskatchewan, affirming the judgment of the Court of King's Bench for the same province, whereby judgment was entered for the respondent company in an action brought by the appellant for damages for injuries. The action is similar in some respects to that of Walpole v. The Canadian Northern Railway Company, in which judgment has lately been delivered by the Board ; but there are material differences both of fact and law to which reference must be made.	**Viscount Cave**; Lord Parmoor; Lord Phillimore; Lord Justice Clerk; Mr. Justice Duff	Appeal dismissed	Saskatchewan Court of Appeal
The City of Montreal v. The Attorney General of Canada	[1922] UKPC 83	"The Statutory Charter of the City of Montreal, as amended from time to time, down to, and including, the session of the provincial legislature of 1912, contains a series of provisions relating to 'assessments and taxation,' 'valuation and assessment rolls,' and 'the sale of immovable for taxes and assessments.' The sole question involved in the present appeal is whether Section 362A of the Charter, one of the sections included under the heading 'assessments and taxation,' is ultra vires the legislature of the Province of Quebec."	Viscount Cave; **Lord Parmoor**; Lord Phillimore; Lord Justice Clerk; Mr. Justice Duff	Appeal allowed	Quebec Court of King's Bench (Appeal Side)
Amelia McColl v. The Canadian Northern Railway Company	[1922] UKPC 84	This appeal presents a question as to the construction of Section 385 of the Railway Act of Canada, and one as to the construction and effect of the Workmen's Compensation Act of Manitoba, Section 13 of Ch. 125 of the Statutes of Manitoba, 6 Geo. V."	Viscount Cave; Lord Parmoor; **Mr. Justice Duff**	Appeal dismissed	Manitoba Court of Appeal
The Grand Trunk Railway Company of Canada v. The King	[1922] UKPC 89	"This is an appeal by special leave from the award, dated the 7th September, 1921, of a Tribunal of Arbitration created by an agreement, which was confirmed by statute, for the purpose of determining the value of the preference and common stocks of the appellant Company for the purpose of the acquisition of the Grand Trunk Railway System by the Canadian Government.' "	**Viscount Birkenhead, Lord Chancellor**; Viscount Cave; Lord Shaw; Lord Parmoor; Lord Carson	Appeal dismissed	Special Tribunal Created for the Ascertainment of the Value of the Preference and Common Stocks of the Grand Trunk Railway Company
The Engineer Mining Company Limited and another v. James Allen Fraser and others	[1922] UKPC 106	"This is an appeal from a judgment of the Court of Appeal of British Columbia dated the 6th June, 1922, affirming a judgment of Clement J. of the 5th October, 1921." "The respondents are the legal representatives of James Alexander, who died on the 26th October, 1918. Mr. Alexander, for some years before his death had caused certain mineral claims to be located, and it is admitted that at his death he had obtained for all these claims Crown grants. He had accordingly, and his representatives have, unless these grants be put out of the way, a statutory title to these mineral claims and all that they embraced."	Viscount Haldane; **Lord Shaw**; Lord Parmoor; Lord Wrenbury; Lord Carson	Appeal dismissed	British Columbia Court of Appeal
The Corporation of the Royal Exchange Assurance (of London) and another v. The Kingsley Navigation Company, Limited	[1923] UKPC 1	Early in the month of November, 1920, the Pacific Mills, Limited, contracted to buy from the Pacific Lime Company, Ltd., 3,000 barrels of lime, to be consigned to them at Ocean Falls, on board a barge called the 'Queen City.' The 'Queen City' belonged to the respondents, the Kingsley Navigation Company, Limited. The barge left Blubber Bay, a port on Texada Island, on the 10th November, 1920, loaded with 3,000 barrels of lime, and some soda ash, and proceeded in tow of a tug to Beaver Cove, a port on Vancouver Island, reaching Beaver Cover on the 11th November, 1920, at six in the morning. On the same morning, at 7 o'clock, smoke was observed rising from the after hatch. The 'Queen City' was towed away into deep water, where she and her cargo were completely burnt and destroyed. The Pacific Mills, Limited, had insured the cargo with the Corporation of the Royal Exchange Assurance, and that Company paid to them the amount of the loss, taking an assignment of their claim against the Kingsley Navigation Company."	Viscount Haldane; Lord Shaw; **Lord Parmoor**; Lord Wrenbury; Lord Carson	Appeal allowed	British Columbia Court of Appeal
The Granby Consolidated Mining Smelting and Power Company Limited v. The Attorney-General of British Columbia	[1923] UKPC 4	"In this action the appellants, who are taxpayers, sue for a declaration as to their rights and liabilities under the Taxation Act, ch. 222 of the Revised Statutes of British Columbia and the amendments thereto. The question is whether they are entitled to the 10 per cent. discount in respect of income tax allowed by Section 10 of the Act, ch. 222, being the Act of 1911."	Viscount Haldane; Lord Shaw; Lord Parmoor; **Lord Wrenbury**; Lord Carson	Appeal allowed	British Columbia Court of Appeal
Brooks-Bidlake and Whittle, Limited v. The Attorney-General of British Columbia and another	[1923] UKPC 6	"This is an appeal by the plaintiffs in the action from a judgment of the Supreme Court of Canada which reversed a judgment of the Supreme Court of British Columbia and dismissed the plaintiffs' actions. The substantial question to be determined is whether the appellants are entitled to a renewal of certain licences to cut and carry away timber from lands belonging to the Province of British Columbia."	**Viscount Cave, Lord Chancellor**; Viscount Haldane; Lord Dunedin; Lord Shaw; Lord Carson	Appeal dismissed	Supreme Court of Canada
Alexandre Michaud v. The City of Montreal	[1923] UKPC 31	"This is an appeal from a judgment of the Court of King's Bench for the Province of Quebec on its appeal side, affirming a judgment of the Superior Court of the District of Montreal, which dismissed the plaintiff's action." "The claim of the appellant in these proceedings is to have possession of a strip of land, formerly part of his property, of which the City of Maisonneuve, to whose rights and obligations the City of Montreal has succeeded, took possession, and which it threw into the public highway."	**Viscount Cave, Lord Chancellor**; Viscount Haldane; Lord Parmoor; Lord Phillimore; Lord Carson	Appeal dismissed	Quebec Court of King's Bench (Appeal Side)
Sir Charles Ross v. The Canadian Bank of Commerce and others	[1923] UKPC 33	"This is an appeal from a judgment of the Appellate Division of the Supreme Court of Ontario, affirming a judgment of the High Court Division of the Supreme Court. The High Court Division had given judgment in the action for the plaintiffs, who are the respondents to the present appeals.	**Viscount Cave, Lord Chancellor**; Viscount Haldane; Lord Parmoor; Lord Phillimore; Lord Carson	Appeal dismissed	Ontario Supreme Court (Appellate Division)
The Montreal Tramways Company v. The City of Montreal and another	[1923] UKPC 34	"These two appeals have been heard together, and each of them raises a question as to the amount of the capital value of the appellant company, the Montreal Tramways Company, for the purposes of its contract with the City of Montreal."	**Viscount Cave, Lord Chancellor**; Viscount Haldane; Lord Parmoor; Lord Phillimore; Lord Carson	Appeal dismissed	Quebec Court of King's Bench (Appeal Side)
George Jaserson v. The Dominion Tobacco Company	[1923] UKPC 58	"This is an appeal from the Supreme Court of Ontario which has affirmed a judgment of the trial Judge, Middleton J. The effect of the judgment is to enable the respondent Company to recover over from the appellant as third party a sum of $5,177.08, which the respondent Company has been ordered to pay to the plaintiff in an action brought by one Peterson against the respondent Company and others to recover damages for failure to accept delivery of tobacco contracted to be sold to it."	**Viscount Haldane**; Lord Sumner; Lord Parmoor; Lord Phillimore	Appeal dismissed	Ontario Supreme Court (Appellate Division)
The Commercial Credit Company of Canada, Limited v. Fulton Brothers	[1923] UKPC 62	"Among the many questions which have been discussed in this case there is one which lies at the threshold of them all. The appellants, plaintiffs in the action, are assignees of an agreement made between one Watt and the Automotive Supply Company, Limited, both of Halifax, Nova Scotia, and they sue to enforce the rights, which that agreement purported to reserve to Watt.	Viscount Haldane; **Lord Sumner**; Lord Parmoor; Lord Phillimore	Appeal dismissed	Nova Scotia Supreme Court
The King and another v. The Canadian Northern Railway Company and another	[1923] UKPC 63	"The appellant, the Provincial Treasurer of Alberta, is designated, in Section 5 of Chapter 30 of the Statutes of Alberta for 1906, as a person in whose name an action can be brought to recover any such penalty or 'double tax,' as is therein referred to, in any Court of competent jurisdiction."	Viscount Haldane; Lord Sumner; **Lord Parmoor**; Lord Phillimore	Appeal dismissed	Supreme Court of Canada
The Fort Frances Pulp and Paper Company, Limited v. The Manitoba Free Press Company, Limited, and others	[1923] UKPC 64	"This appeal raises questions of some novelty and delicacy. The appellants are manufacturers of newsprint paper in Ontario, and the respondents are publishers of newspapers, carrying on business at various places in Canada. The action out of which the appeal arises was brought by the respondents against the appellants to recover sums the former had paid for paper delivered to them at controlled prices. These sums, which the respondents alleged to represent margins in excess of the prices regulated by law, they claimed to be repayable to them as the result of orders of the Paper Control Tribunal of Canada, the final order having been made on the 8th July, 1920."	**Viscount Haldane**; Lord Buckmaster; Lord Sumner; Lord Parmoor; Lord Phillimore	Appeal dismissed	Ontario Supreme Court (Appellate Division)
The United States of America and another v. Motor Trucks, Limited	[1923] UKPC 66	"The present dispute, like so many others, had its origin in the sudden termination of the Great War. The entry of the United States of America into that war, and their desire to add to the resources already existing in that country, and available for the manufacture of warlike munitions, led to a number of contracts with Canadian firms. Amongst others the respondents to this appeal, Motor Trucks, Limited, who were carrying on a manufacturing business in the City of Brantford, in Ontario, entered into a contract dated the 18th May, 1918, with the United States Government."	**Earl of Birkenhead**; Viscount Haldane; Lord Sumner; Sir Henry Duke; Mr. Justice Duff	Appeal allowed	Ontario Supreme Court (Appellate Division)
The United States Fidelity and Guaranty Company v. The King and another	[1923] UKPC 67	"This is an appeal from a judgment of the Supreme Court of Canada affirming judgments of the Court of Appeal and Supreme Court of British Columbia whereby upon a bond given to secure payment of Succession Duty under a statute of British Columbia, $44,287.50 was found payable by the obligors of the bond, the now appellants and one Lorenzo Joseph Quagliotti."	Earl of Birkenhead; Viscount Haldane; Lord Sumner; **Sir Henry Duke**	Appeal dismissed	Supreme Court of Canada
Sir Alexandre Lacoste and others v. Dame Mary M. Duchesnay and others	[1923] UKPC 68	"The appellants are the executors of the will of the Honourable Charles Wilson, who died at Montreal on the 21st May, 1877, and the respondent was the plaintiff in the action out of which the appeal arises; an action claiming immediate partition of the estate."	Viscount Haldane; Lord Sumner; **Mr. Justice Duff**	Appeal allowed	Quebec Court of King's Bench (Appeal Side)
The King v. The Attorney-General of British Columbia	[1923] UKPC 69	"The issue in this appeal is whether, under the British North America Act, 1867, Sections 102 and 109, bona vacantia, found in the Province of British Columbia, belong to the Crown in right of the Province or in right of the Dominion."	Viscount Haldane; Lord Buckmaster; Lord Atkinson; Lord Shaw; **Lord Sumner**	Appeal dismissed	Supreme Court of Canada
The Attorney-General of British Columbia v. The Attorney-General of Canada and the Attorney-General of Ontario (Intervener)	[1923] UKPC 70	"The question raised upon this appeal is whether there is power conferred upon the Dominion Parliament by the British North America Act of 1867 to impose Customs duties or Excise or sales tax upon goods when they enter the Dominion although they are the property of one of the Provinces."	Viscount Haldane; **Lord Buckmaster**; Lord Atkinson; Lord Shaw; Lord Sumner	Appeal dismissed	Supreme Court of Canada
The Attorney-General of British Columbia v. The Attorney-General of Canada and others	[1923] UKPC 71	"This is an appeal from a judgment of the Supreme Court of Canada, expressing the answers to two questions submitted to that Court by the Governor General of Canada in Council, under the Canadian Supreme Court Act. The first of the questions was whether the legislature of British Columbia had power to enact Chapter 49 of its Statutes for 1921, being an Act to validate and confirm certain Orders in Council and provisions relating to the employment of persons on Crown property. The second question was, if the Court thought the Act ultra vires in part only, in what particulars was it ultra vires."	**Viscount Haldane**; Lord Buckmaster; Lord Atkinson; Lord Shaw; Lord Sumner	Appeal dismissed	Supreme Court of Canada
The Honourable David Lynch Scott v. The Attorney-General of Canada and others	[1923] UKPC 72	"This is an appeal by special leave from a judgment of the Supreme Court of Canada, dated the 2nd May, 1922, on a reference by the Governor-General in Council under Section 60 of the Supreme Court Act (R.S.C. 1906, c. 139) of certain questions touching the right of the Honourable Horace Harvey, notwithstanding the statutes passed by the legislature of Alberta in the years 1919 and 1920, to continue to hold the office of Chief Justice of the Supreme Court of Alberta. And also touching the validity and effectiveness of certain letters patent dated the 15th September, 1921, issued under the Great Seal of Canada, nominating him to the office and to the style and title of Chief Justice of the Trial Division of the Supreme Court of Alberta."	Viscount Haldane; Lord Buckmaster; **Lord Atkinson**; Lord Shaw; Lord Sumner	Appeal allowed	Supreme Court of Canada
Julius Carlos Clausen and others v. Canada Timber and Lands, Limited	[1923] UKPC 73	"The appellants are seven members of a partnership of eight persons, formed in British Columbia on the 12th May, 1921, to carry on the business of general loggers under the name of the Toba River Logging Company, which performed in part a contract, entered into about the same date with the first respondent, the Canada Timber and Lands, Limited, for the cutting and purchase of a large quantity of timber growing on the stump, which was owned or controlled by the company. They were plaintiffs in the action, and sued the Canada Timber and Lands, Limited, for damages for breach of this contract ..."	Lord Buckmaster; **Lord Sumner**; Mr. Justice Duff	Appeal allowed	British Columbia Court of Appeal
Shannon Realities, Limited v. The Town of St. Michel; Napoleon Pesant and others v. The Town of St. Michel	[1923] UKPC 81	"The true question in these appeals has reference to a provision in the Code of Civil Procedure for Quebec (60 Vict., c. 48, as re-enacted by 10 Geo. V, c. 79). That provision is Art. 50, and is to the following effect :— 'Excepting the Court of King's Bench, all courts, circuit judges and magistrates, and all other persons and bodies politic and corporate, within the Province, are subject to the superintending and reforming power, order and control of the Superior Court and of the judges thereof in such manner and form as by law provided.' The appellants maintained that they were entitled to certain remedies under that section."	Viscount Haldane; Lord Buckmaster; Lord Atkinson; **Lord Shaw**; Lord Sumner	Appeal dismissed	Supreme Court of Canada
The Attorney-General of Ontario v. The Reciprocal Insurers having no licences under the Dominion Insurance Act and others	[1924] UKPC 5	"Availing himself of the provisions of the provincial statute, chapter 85, R.S.O. 1914, the Lieutenant-Governor of Ontario on the 10th May, 1922 referred to the Appellate Division of the Supreme Court of Ontario three separate questions in the following terms ..."	Viscount Haldane; Lord Buckmaster; Lord Shaw; Lord Sumner; **Mr. Justice Duff**	Appeal allowed	Ontario Supreme Court (Appellate Division)
The Montreal Light Heat and Power Company v. The City of Montreal	[1924] UKPC 22	"The solution of the question raised on this appeal depends on the construction of Section 39 of a statute, 9 Edward VII, c. 81, passed in 1909, to amend the Charter of the City of Montreal."	**Lord Buckmaster**; Lord Atkinson; Lord Wrenbury; Lord Darling	Appeal allowed	Quebec Court of King's Bench (Appeal Side)
Frank K. Brown v. Phil H. Moore	[1924] UKPC 23	"This is an appeal from an order of the Supreme Court of Nova Scotia (en banc) dated the 4th May, 1922, dismissing an appeal by the appellant from the order of Mr. Justice Mellish, dated the 5th January, 1922, ordering inter alia that the report of Harvey C. Crowell, a referee to whom certain matters had been referred for enquiry and report by order of Mr. Justice Mellish, dated the 20th November, 1920, be confirmed and decreeing the rights of the parties on the basis of the findings contained in the said report."	Lord Clyde, The Lord President; **Lord Atkinson**; Lord Shaw; Lord Wrenbury; Lord Darling	Appeal dismissed	Nova Scotia Supreme Court (en banc)
The Attorney-General of Ontario v. Herbert J. Daly, since deceased, and others	[1924] UKPC 57	"In this case the Attorney-General of Ontario appeals by special leave from an order of the Appellate Division of the Supreme Court of Ontario affirming (with a variation) an order made by Mr. Justice Middleton in Chambers. The learned Judge by his order directed that the County Court Judges Criminal Court of the County of York and the Judge of that Court should take the proceedings required to be taken under sec. 827 of the Criminal Code of Canada and should try the respondents Daly and others on the charges set out in certain indictments found against them by the grand jury at the assizes for that County; and this order was affirmed by the Appellate Division with the addition of the proviso saving the right of the Attorney-General under sec. 825, subs. 5, of the Criminal Code to require that one of those charges (which alleged an offence punishable by imprisonment for seven years) should be tried by a jury."	**Viscount Cave**; Lord Dunedin; Lord Carson; Lord Blanesburgh; Lord Darling	Appeal dismissed	Ontario Supreme Court (Appellate Division)
The Honourable J.E. Hetherington, Provincial Secretary-Treasurer of the Province of New Brunswick v. The Security Export Company, Limited	[1924] UKPC 58	"The first question that arises on this appeal is whether the Supreme Court of Canada were right in holding that an order could be made for the issue of a writ of certiorari to remove into the Supreme Court of New Brunswick a distress warrant issued by the appellant under section 6 of the New Brunswick Liquor Exporters Taxation Act."	**Lord Buckmaster**; Lord Dunedin; Lord Phillimore; Lord Carson	Appeal allowed	Supreme Court of Canada
The Montreal Tramways Company v. La Ville de Montréal Nord	[1924] UKPC 59	"In the town of Montreal Nord there is a tramway which goes through the town. It is constructed on a strip of land which belongs in property to the Company. There is a street called the Avenue des Récollets which abuts on the tramway from the north and so forms a cul de sac. The town having expanded to the south, there is another street also called Avenue des Récollets which has been constructed opposite to the first and also forms a cul de sac. The town wished to connect the two streets by a level crossing across the tramway lines and so abolish the cul de sac and make the Avenues des Récollets an end to end street."	Viscount Cave; **Lord Dunedin**; Lord Carson; Lord Blanesburgh; Mr. Justice Duff	Appeal allowed	Quebec Court of King's Bench (Appeal Side)
The Honourable J.E. Caron v. The King	[1924] UKPC 66	"This is an appeal from a judgment of the Supreme Court of Canada affirming the judgment of Audette J. in the Exchequer Court upon an information filed by the Attorney-General on Canada on behalf of H.M. The King, whereby the appellant Caron was ordered to pay the sum of $210 with interest and costs."	Viscount Cave; **Lord Phillimore**; Lord Blanesburgh; Sir Adrian Knox, C.J.A.	Appeal dismissed	Supreme Court of Canada
Mary Brodie Laing and another v. The Toronto General Trusts Corporation and others	[1924] UKPC 69	"This is an appeal from an order of the Second Appellate Division of the Supreme Court of Ontario..." "The final purpose of the action was to have set aside two voluntary settlements, one ante-nuptial, of the 11th December, 1915, and the other post-nuptial, of the 14th March, 1916, whereby the appellant, Mrs. Laing, settled, by the one settlement, certain personal property, and by the other certain real estate inherited by her under the will of an aunt who had died in 1912."	Viscount Cave; Lord Dunedin; Lord Carson; **Lord Blanesburgh**	Appeal dismissed	Ontario Supreme Court (Appellate Division)
The Northern Pipe Line Company, Limited, and others v. The Canadian Gas Company, Limited	[1924] UKPC 70	"Under an agreement dated the 27th May, 1908, between the Leamington Oil Company and Holmes and Gordon the predecessors of the appellants the Pipe Line Company, as amended by a subsequent agreement dated the 7th September, 1909, between the Leamington Oil Company and the Pipe Line Company (which had assumed the obligations of Holmes and Gordon under the parent agreement of 1908) the Leamington Oil Company became bound to supply natural gas to the Pipe Line Company to the extent of the capacity of its mills and that Company agreed to provide a pipe line and its accessories for conducting this gas to Wallaceburg in Kent County in Ontario and there to sell it for use as fuel by a Sugar Refinery owned by the Dominion Sugar Company and a Glass Manufactory, owned by the predecessors of the Dominion Glass Company, as well as to the inhabitants of the town for domestic purposes."	Viscount Cave; Lord Dunedin; Lord Carson; Lord Blanesburgh; **Mr. Justice Duff**	Appeal allowed	Ontario Supreme Court (Appellate Division)
Charles W. Gunning and others v. Charles A. Lusby and others	[1924] UKPC 74	"This is an appeal from the unanimous judgment of the Full Court of the Supreme Court of Nova Scotia dated the 6th February, 1922, allowing an appeal from a judgment of Harris, C.J., dated the 1st June, 1921. The Court of Appeal was composed of Ritchie, Russel and Chisholm, JJ."	**Lord Atkinson**; Lord Sumner; Sir Adrian Knox, C.J.A.	Appeal dismissed	Nova Scotia Supreme Court
The Ontario and Minnesota Power Company Limited v. The King	[1924] UKPC 75	"This is an appeal by the Ontario and Minnesota Power Company Limited from a judgment of the Supreme Court of Canada by which the appellants were held liable for all damages sustained by His Majesty or by the Indians concerned as a result of the flooding or erosion of certain Indian Reserves bordering on the Rainy Lake by reason of a dam erected by the appellants in the Rainy River. The appellants do not deny that some damage was caused by their dam, but they justify under a grant made by the Government of the Province of Ontario in the year 1905; and the question is whether that grant absolves them from liability."	**Viscount Cave**; Lord Dunedin; Lord Carson; Lord Blanesburgh	Appeal allowed in part	Supreme Court of Canada
The Corporation of the City of Toronto v. The Toronto Railway Company	[1924] UKPC 77	"These appeals are brought, the first by the Corporation of the City of Toronto and the second by the Toronto Railway Company, against an order of the Appellate Division of the Supreme Court of Ontario dated the 24th September, 1923. By that order the Appellate Division on an appeal from an order of Mr. Justice Logie partly allowed and partly refused a motion by the Corporation to set aside an award made by arbitrators in relation to the taking over by the Corporation from the Railway Company of certain street railways in Toronto, and also dismissed a motion by the Railway Company to set aside the same award."	Viscount Cave; Lord Dunedin; Lord Shaw; Lord Carson; **Lord Blanesburgh**	Appeal allowed in part	Ontario Supreme Court (Appellate Division)
The Great Lakes Steamship Company v. The Maple Leaf Milling Company, Limited	[1924] UKPC 78	"The appellants are a Steamship Company, having their operating office at Cleveland, Ohio, United States of America, and are the owners of the 'John Dunn, Jr.,' a freight vessel sailing on the Great Lakes lying between Canada and the United States. The respondents are one of the largest Milling Companies in Canada, and were the owners at Port Colborne, which is situated at the easterly end of Lake Erie, of an elevator and flour mill."	Viscount Cave; Lord Dunedin; **Lord Carson**; Lord Blanesburgh; Mr. Justice Duff	Appeal allowed	Ontario Supreme Court (Appellate Division)
The Great West Permanent Loan Company and others v. Jacob E. Friesen and others	[1924] UKPC 79	"These appeals are brought from judgment of the Court of Appeal of Saskatchewan in two actions. In one, the respondents Friesen and others, trustees of the Mennonite Colony, who will be referred to as 'the Mennonite Trustees,' were plaintiffs, and The Saskatchewan Mortgage and Trust Corporation, Limited (hereinafter called 'the Trust Company'), The Mennonite Land Sales Company, Limited (hereinafter called 'the Sales Company'), John Murphy, The Great West Permanent Loan Company (hereinafter called 'The Loan Company'), J.J. Logan, J.F. Taylor, Geddie-McKay, Limited, and J.A. Campbell were defendants. In the other the Sales Company was plaintiff and the Mennonite Trustees were defendants."	Viscount Cave; Lord Blanesburgh; Mr. Justice Duff; **Sir Adrian Knox, C.J.A.**	Appeal allowed in part	Saskatchewan Court of Appeal
The Mutual Life Insurance Company of New York v. The Ontario Metal Products Company Limited	[1924] UKPC 107	"This is an appeal from a judgment of the Supreme Court of Canada reversing a judgment of the Appellate Division of the Supreme Court of Ontario and restoring the judgment of the Trial Judge. There has been a great diversity of judicial opinion in the Courts below and for this reason, apart from the general importance of some of the points raised in argument and on which the decision of the case, at least, partly depends, it is necessary to deal in some detail with the facts out of which the controversy arises."	Viscount Haldane; Lord Dunedin; Lord Atkinson; Lord Wrenbury; **Lord Salvesen**	Appeal dismissed	Supreme Court of Canada
The Lord's Day Alliance of Canada v. The Attorney-General of Manitoba and the Attorney-General of Canada (Intervener)	[1924] UKPC 112	"This appeal, relating to the permissibility or otherwise of certain Sunday excursions within the Province of Manitoba, raises important questions as to the legislative powers in relation to such matters possessed by the Parliament of Canada on the one hand and the different Provincial Legislatures on the other. Is it open to a Provincial Legislature to permit such excursions within its own province? Or, is such a matter, even in this aspect of it, now parcel of the criminal law so as to be within the legislative competence of the Dominion Parliament alone?"	Viscount Cave, Lord Chancellor; Lord Dunedin; Lord Carson; **Lord Blanesburgh**; Mr. Justice Duff	Appeal dismissed	Manitoba Court of Appeal
Evariste Brassard in place of J.W. Levesque v. Harriett W. Smith and others	[1924] UKPC 114	"Mr. Wiley Smith died on the 28th February, 1916, domiciled in Nova Scotia and intestate. The respondents are his administrators appointed by the Probate Court of Halifax in Nova Scotia. Part of his property consisted of shares in the Royal Bank of Canada. The appellant, who was the plaintiff in the action, is the collector of succession duties in the Province of Quebec and he sues the respondents for succession duty in respect of these shares."	Viscount Haldane; **Lord Dunedin**; Lord Atkinson; Lord Wrenbury; Lord Salvesen	Appeal dismissed	Supreme Court of Canada
The Toronto Electric Commissioners v. Colin G. Snider and others and The Attorney-General of Canada and The Attorney-General of Ontario, Interveners	[1925] UKPC 2	"It is always with reluctance that their Lordships come to a conclusion adverse to the constitutional validity of any Canadian statute that has been before the public for years as having been validly enacted, but the duty incumbent on the Judicial Committee, now as always, is simply to interpret the British North America Act and to decide whether the statute in question has been within the competence of the Dominion Parliament under the terms of section 91 of that Act. In this case the Judicial Committee have come to the conclusion that it was not.	**Viscount Haldane**; Lord Dunedin; Lord Atkinson; Lord Wrenbury; Lord Salvesen	Appeal allowed	Ontario Supreme Court (Appellate Division)
The Attorney General of Ontario v. The Attorney General of Canada	[1925] UKPC 15	"Their Lordships do not see their way to differing from the decision of the Appellate Division in this case." "The question to be determined in these proceeding is whether the Judicature Act passed by the Legislature of Ontario in the year 1924 was within the powers of the legislature ; and for the purpose of deciding that question it is necessary to refer to certain provisions of the British North America Act, 1867. Section 92 of that Act entrusts to the Provincial Legislature the duty of making laws in respect of, among other things, the administration of justice in the Province, including the constitution, maintenance and organisation of the Provincial Courts, both of civil and criminal jurisdiction, and including procedure in civil matters in those Courts. Section 96 of the same Act provides that the Governor-General shall appoint the Judges of the Superior, District and County Courts in each Province, except those of the Courts of Probate in Nova Scotia and New Brunswick."	**Viscount Cave, Lord Chancellor**; Viscount Haldane; Lord Dunedin; Lord Shaw; Lord Phillimore	Appeal dismissed	Ontario Supreme Court (Appellate Division)
The Attorney-General of Manitoba v. The Attorney-General of Canada and others	[1925] UKPC 21	"This case comes by way of appeal from the Supreme Court of Canada. To that Court the Governor-General of Canada had, under a statutory power, referred two questions relating to the constitutional validity of a taxing statute passed by the Legislature of Manitoba."	Viscount Cave, Lord Chancellor; **Viscount Haldane**; Lord Dunedin; Lord Blanesburgh; Lord Darling	Appeal dismissed	Supreme Court of Canada
The Attorney-General of New Brunswick v. The Canadian Pacific Railway Company and another and The Attorney-General of Canada (Intervener)	[1925] UKPC 22	"The principal question involved in the proceedings is whether the right to regulate navigation on the St. John River where both banks of the river are within New Brunswick rests with His Majesty in right of the Dominion, or with His Majesty in right of the Province of New Brunswick."	**Viscount Cave, Lord Chancellor**; Viscount Haldane; Lord Dunedin; Lord Shaw; Lord Phillimore	Appeal dismissed	New Brunswick Supreme Court (Appeal Division)
Aristide Ouellette v. The Canadian Pacific Railway Company	[1925] UKPC 26	"The respondent Company operates a line of railway running through Hull near Ottawa in the Province of Ontario. The line crosses, at rail level, St. Florent Street of the former town. The level crossing is open, without protecting gates or guard."	Viscount Haldane; Lord Dunedin; **Lord Shaw**; Lord Phillimore; Lord Darling	Appeal allowed	Supreme Court of Canada
Charles Edward Wilson v. Beatrice Maud Kinnear and others	[1925] UKPC 27	"The appellant, Charles Edward Wilson, and the late Mrs. Wilson, of whose will probate is sought in this suit by the first two respondents, executors named in that will, being members of the sect known as Christian Scientists, went in 1891 through a so-called ceremony of marriage celebrated by a lady member of the same sect. They lived together as man and wife till 1916. In that year Mrs. Wilson, conceiving that she had just cause, complained in respect of Mr. Wilson's relations to another lady member of the sect, brought the matter before the Church Court and accused her husband of adultery. The reply he made was that he could not be charged with adultery as he was not married, the so-called marriage being no marriage in the eye of the law. This defence, though well-founded in law, not unnaturally provoked great scandal in the Church to which the parties belonged, and the parties separated."	Viscount Haldane; **Lord Dunedin**; Lord Phillimore; Lord Darling	Appeal allowed	Ontario Supreme Court (Appellate Division)
Wing Lee v. David C. Lew, since deceased, now represented by Yick Pang Lew, the Administrator of his Estate	[1925] UKPC 36	"This appeal arises out of a dispute which was originally nothing more serious than a quarrel between two adjacent landowners. On the 28th December, 1922, an information was issued by the appellant against one David Lew charging him with having removed a landmark that lay between his property and what David Lew claimed as a road. That information failed, and David Lew accordingly took proceedings against the appellant claiming damages for malicious prosecution. On the 28th June, 1923, verdict and judgment were given in that action, the result of which was that David Lew obtained a judgment for 5,490 dollars and costs."	**Lord Buckmaster**; Earl of Oxford and Asquith; Lord Atkinson; Lord Shaw; Lord Parmoor	Appeal allowed in part	Supreme Court of Canada
Thomas Caven v. The Canadian Pacific Railway Company	[1925] UKPC 59	"The appellant at the time of the incidents about to be referred to, culminating in his dismissal in October, 1923, had been for a good many years in the service of the respondents, the Canadian Pacific Railway, as a passenger conductor. In November, 1920, an agreement, called the Union Agreement, was entered into between the railway company and its conductors and various other servants, the agreement to 'remain in force subject to 30 days' notice from either party'. It is matter of admission that the contract of service between the respondents and the appellant was regulated by this agreement. The appellant explains quite properly in his evidence that he read Exhibit I, and from that time, namely, in 1920, when he received it, and up to the time of his discharge, he worked under it.	Lord Buckmaster; Lord Atkinson; **Lord Shaw**; Lord Parmoor	Appeal dismissed	Alberta Supreme Court (Appellate Division)
The Ticonderoga Pulp and Paper Company v. Percy P. Cowans and others	[1925] UKPC 63	"This is an appeal from a judgment of the Court of King's Bench for the Province of Quebec on its appeal side, reversing a judgment of Mr. Justice Doclos and giving judgment for the respondents, who were the plaintiffs in the action. In their Lordships' opinion there is no substantial foundation for the appeal, and it might be sufficient for them to base their decision upon the reasons given by Chief Justice Lafontaine, with which their Lordships find themselves in entire agreement; but, as important interests are involved and the case has been vigorously argued, it is desirable to indicate shortly the manner in which the case presents itself to the Board."	**Viscount Cave, Lord Chancellor**; Viscount Haldane; Lord Shaw; Lord Carson; Mr. Justice Duff	Appeal dismissed	Quebec Court of King's Bench (Appeal Side)
The Trustee of the Property of Andrew Motherwell of Canada, Limited, in Bankruptcy v. Alexander F. Zimmerman and another	[1925] UKPC 69	"This is an appeal from a judgment of the Appellate Division of the Supreme Court of Ontario, affirming a judgment of Mr. Justice Mowat of the 27th May, 1922. That judgment was in favour of the plaintiffs, the present respondents, in an action for payment or foreclosure under a mortgage dated the 7th December, 1920, to secure $25,000 and interest. The defence was that the mortgage was invalidly created."	**Viscount Haldane**; Viscount Finlay; Lord Shaw; Lord Carson; Lord Blanesburgh	Appeal dismissed	Ontario Supreme Court (Appellate Division)
Joseph W. Post v. Walter N. Langell	[1925] UKPC 76	"This is a difficult case, but their Lordships think it desirable that they should deal with it at once. It is unnecessary to recite all the facts, which appear from the judgments of the Courts in Ontario; and it will be enough to state the conclusions at which their Lordships have arrived."	**Viscount Cave, Lord Chancellor**; Viscount Haldane; Lord Carson; Mr. Justice Duff	Appeal allowed	Ontario Supreme Court (Appellate Division)
The Corporation of the City of Toronto v. The Board of Trustees of the Roman Catholic Separate Schools for the City of Toronto	[1925] UKPC 79	"This appeal raises some important questions as to the relative rights of a School Board acting under the Separate Schools Act of Ontario and a City Council acting under the Municipal Act of that Province. By virtue of the Separate Schools Act, the Board of Trustees of the Roman Catholic Separate Schools for the City of Toronto (who will be referred to in this judgment as the "School Board") have power to acquire or rent school sites and to build and carry on schools. By virtue of the Municipal Act, the Corporation of the City of Toronto is empowered to prohibit by by-law the use of land or the erection or use of buildings within any defined area for any purpose other than that of a private residence. The question is whether, in the circumstances of this case, a by-law made by the Corporation under the latter statute is enforceable in respect of a site purchased by the School Board for school purposes."	**Viscount Cave, Lord Chancellor**; Viscount Haldane; Lord Shaw; Lord Carson; Lord Blanesburgh	Appeal allowed	Supreme Court of Canada
The Palatine Insurance Company Limited v. John A. Gregory	[1925] UKPC 87	"The question to be determined on these appeals is, what effect is to be given in the circumstances of this case to certain sections of the New Brunswick Fire Insurance Policies Act."	**Viscount Cave, Lord Chancellor**; Viscount Haldane; Lord Carson; Mr. Justice Duff	Appeal dismissed	New Brunswick Supreme Court (Appeal Division)
The Niagara, St. Catharines and Toronto Railway Company v. The Lakes and St. Lawrence Transit Company	[1925] UKPC 92	"Mr. Justice Hodgins, the local judge in Admiralty, who tried this action, held that the bridge tender in charge for the appellants of the operation for opening the bridge on the occasion in question was guilty of negligence and want of reasonsable forethought from which the entire consequence flowed. He based his judgment largely upon the admissions of the bridge tender himself, called as a witness on behalf of the appellants."	Viscount Cave, Lord Chancellor; Viscount Haldane; Lord Shaw**Lord Carson**	Appeal dismissed	Supreme Court of Canada
The City of Montreal and others v. The Harbour Commissioners of Montreal and others	[1925] UKPC 94	"These appeals were heard together. There are questions of law which are common to both, as well as issues of fact which present some analogies. It will be convenient to deal with the appeal of the City of Montreal in the first place, in a judgment which will extend to both appeals, but will be based on certain considerations which are materially different in the two cases."	Viscount Cave, Lord Chancellor; **Viscount Haldane**; Lord Shaw; Lord Carson; Mr. Justice Duff	Appeal allowed	Quebec Court of King's Bench (Appeal Side)
J.L.A. Tetreault and others v. The Harbour Commissioners of Montreal and others	[1925] UKPC 95	"These appeals were heard together. There are questions of law which are common to both, as well as issues of fact which present some analogies. It will be convenient to deal with the appeal of the City of Montreal in the first place, in a judgment which will extend to both appeals, but will be based on certain considerations which are materially different in the two cases."	Viscount Cave, Lord Chancellor; **Viscount Haldane**; Lord Shaw; Lord Carson; Mr. Justice Duff	Appeal allowed	Quebec Court of King's Bench (Appeal Side)
The Lord Strathcona Steamship Company, Limited v. The Dominion Coal Company, Limited	[1925] UKPC 97	"This is an appeal from a judgment and order of the Supreme Court in Appeal of Nova Scotia (En Banc), dated the 1st March, 1924, which affirmed a judgment and order of Mr. Justice Mellish in the Supreme Court of Nova Scotia, dated the 18th May, 1922." "The questions involved in the case depend upon a consideration of the charter party about to be mentioned and of the actings of parties under and in reference to that contract."	Viscount Haldane; **Lord Shaw**; Lord Wrenbury; Lord Carson; Lord Blanesburgh	Appeal allowed in part	Nova Scotia Supreme Court in Appeal (En Banc)
The King v. The Anderson Logging Company, Limited	[1925] UKPC 99	"The respondent Company were incorporated in 1907. In 1910 they purchased certain timber limits at the price of $87,500, which was calculated on the probable yield of timber at $1 per 1,000 feet."	**Lord Dunedin**; Lord Sumner; Lord Wrenbury; Lord Darling; Lord Salvesen	Appeal dismissed	Supreme Court of Canada
The Attorney General of Alberta v. Reata E. Cook	[1926] UKPC 10	"This is the appeal of the Attorney-General of Alberta from the judgment of the Supreme Court (Appellate Division) granting a decree of divorce in an undefended suit which in the Trial Division had been dismissed for want of jurisdiction. The questions involved are of general importance, namely, whether a wife judicially separated from her husband may acquire a domicil of choice apart from the husband, and whether in the Courts of such her domicil she may obtain a decree of divorce upon grounds sufficient under the law there in force, although the husband is not there domiciled."	Viscount Cave, Lord Chancellor; Viscount Haldane; Viscount Dunedin; Lord Shaw; Lord Phillimore; Lord Blanesburgh; **Lord Merrivale**	Appeal allowed	Alberta Supreme Court (Appellate Division)
The British Columbia Electric Railway Company, Limited v. Kathleen Pribble	[1926] UKPC 11	"The respondent was a passenger on the appellants' street railway in the City of Vancouver, who had paid her fare and reached the end of her journey, and fell from the car as she was getting off the step at the rear of it. There was a hole in the step, which ought not to have been there, and her heel caught in it so that, as she moved, her foot was held. Her injuries were grave. Rather more than six months afterwards she brought her action. She recovered judgment for $5,000.	Lord Dunedin; **Lord Sumner**; Lord Wrenbury; Lord Darling; Lord Salvesen	Appeal allowed	British Columbia Court of Appeal
Frank Nadan v. The King	[1926] UKPC 13	"These are appeals from two judgments of the Appellate Division of the Supreme Court of Alberta dismissing appeals against conviction by a police magistrate; and, in the course of the argument, important questions have been raised as to the Royal Prerogative and as to the jurisdiction of this Board."	**Viscount Cave, Lord Chancellor**; Lord Dunedin; Lord Shaw; Lord Phillimore; Lord Blanesburgh	Appeal dismissed	Alberta Supreme Court (Appellate Division)
The Montreal Transportation Company, Limited v. The King	[1926] UKPC 16	"Their Lordships do not consider it necessary to hear counsel for the respondent in this appeal. This case has been ably and strenuously argued on behalf of the appellants, but their Lordships have come to the conclusion that they cannot differ from the decision which was arrived at by Mr. Justice Audette and the Supreme Court of Canada."	**Viscount Cave, Lord Chancellor**; Viscount Haldane; Lord Parmoor; Lord Wrenbury; Lord Blanesburgh	Appeal dismissed	Supreme Court of Canada
Eric Grant Peter v. The Yorkshire Estate Company, Limited, and another	[1926] UKPC 17	"It is impossible not to feel sorry for the appellant in this case, but the decision must depend upon the construction of the Workmen's Compensation Act of British Columbia. Their Lordships do not feel any doubt as to the meaning of that Act." "The Act sets up a fund which is maintained by contributions, and which is available for compensating all workmen falling within the Act who suffer injury in the course of their employment."	**Viscount Cave, Lord Chancellor**; Lord Parmoor; Lord Wrenbury; Lord Blanesburgh; Lord Darling	Appeal dismissed	British Columbia Court of Appeal
The United Manufacturing Company v. The St. Maurice Power Company Limited	[1926] UKPC 36	"This is an appeal from a judgment of the Court of King's Bench (Appeal Side) for Quebec which reversed a judgment of the Superior Court of the Province given by Maclennan J. The later judgment sustained an action of the appellants against the respondent Company, and enjoined the latter from doing any act which might interfere with what was held to be the vested right of the appellants to construct a dam or dams across the St. Maurice River, a tributary of the St. Lawrence. It also dismissed the intervention of the Attorney-General."	Viscount Cave, Lord Chancellor; **Viscount Haldane**; Lord Atkinson; Lord Shaw; Lord Parmoor	Appeal dismissed	Quebec Court of King's Bench (Appeal Side)
The Attorney-General of Quebec v. The Nipissing Central Railway Company and another	[1926] UKPC 39	"The Nipissing Central Railway Company was incorporated by an Act of the Dominion of Canada (No. 112 of 1907) for the purposes of constructing and operating certain lines of railway, including a line extending from Latchford, in the Province of Ontario to a point on the line of the Grand Trunk Pacific Railway in the Province of Quebec. The plan and book of reference for this line, as approved by the Board of Railway Commissioners, show a line traversing lands belonging to the Crown in right of the Province of Quebec."	**Viscount Cave, Lord Chancellor**; Viscount Haldane; Lord Atkinson; Lord Shaw; Lord Parmoor	Appeal dismissed	Supreme Court of Canada
Noe Letang v. The Ottawa Electric Railway Company	[1926] UKPC 42	"The action is a claim for damages for negligence in respect of an accident to the wife of the appellant, who slipped upon certain steps on the respondents' property. The steps were covered with ice and she fell heavily and sustained serious injury. It is clear that in such a case great weight must attach to the views and verdict of the Judge who tried the case."	Viscount Cave, Lord Chancellor; Viscount Haldane; Lord Atkinson; **Lord Shaw**; Lord Parmoor	Appeal allowed	Supreme Court of Canada
Price Brothers and Company, Limited v. The King	[1926] UKPC 47	"This is an appeal from a judgment of the Supreme Court of Canada dated the 20th of May, 1925. The Trial Judge decided in favour of the appellants who were the plaintiffs in the action and his judgment was unanimously confirmed by the Court of King's Bench. The Supreme Court of Canada by a majority reversed the judgment of the King's Bench, Duff J. dissenting."	Viscount Haldane; Lord Shaw; Lord Wrenbury; Lord Darling; **Lord Salvesen**	Appeal allowed	Supreme Court of Canada
Joseph Fournier v. The Canadian National Railway Company	[1926] UKPC 50	"This is an appeal in formâ pauperis by special leave from a judgment of the Supreme Court of Canada dated the 27th May, 1925, reversing a judgment of the Court of King's Bench for the Province of Quebec (Appeal Side) dated the 4th December, 1924, which confirmed on the points material to this appeal, but set aside on the other grounds, the judgment of the Superior Court of the Province of Quebec (District of Rimouski) given in favour of the appellant on the 17th May, 1924."	Viscount Cave, Lord Chancellor; Viscount Haldane; **Lord Atkinson**; Lord Shaw; Lord Parmoor	Appeal dismissed	Supreme Court of Canada
William Henry Pope Jarvis v. Mary Isabel Jarvis	[1926] UKPC 51	"This is an appeal from a judgment of the Second Appellate Division of the Supreme Court of Ontario, affirming, with a variation, the judgment of the Trial Judge, Riddell, J. Three questions were argued in this appeal on the hearing before their Lordships."	Viscount Haldane; Lord Atkinson; Lord Shaw; **Lord Parmoor**; Lord Wrenbury	Appeal allowed in part	Ontario Supreme Court (Appellate Division)
Eugene C. Audet and others v. Eugene Trudel and others	[1926] UKPC 58	"The Banque Nationale was a Bank carrying on business in Quebec. In the year 1915, under Chap. 123 of the Revised Statutes of Canada, 1906, a contributory pension fund for the employees of the Bank was formed and incorporated under the name of La Société de la Caisse de Retraite de la Banque Nationale. This last-named Company is hereinafter called the Society. By a contract dated 3rd January, 1924, ratified by Order in Council on the 30th April, 1924, all the assets of the Banque Nationale were assigned to La Banque d'Hochelaga ... The question to be determined is as to the rights of the different contributors to the Society's funds in the distribution of the assets upon the true construction of the Bye-laws."	Viscount Haldane; Lord Shaw; **Lord Wrenbury**; Lord Darling; Lord Salvesen	Appeal dismissed	Supreme Court of Canada
The Permutit Company v. George Leonard Borrowman	[1926] UKPC 68	"This appeal relates to two conflicting applications for a patent for the use of greensand or glauconite for the purpose of softening water. The contest throughout the proceedings has been upon the question as to who, as between two persons, Mr. Spencer, through whom the appellants claim, on the one hand, and Mr. Borrowman, the respondent, on the other, was in fact the first and true inventor of the process in question. It is important to bear in mind that the Courts in Canada have not decided, nor are their Lordships today asked to decide, whether there is here an invention by one party or the other which is capable of being patented under Section 7 of the Patent Act, Chapter 69 of the Revised Statutes of Canada, 1906. In other words, their Lordships have not to decide in this case whether there is subject matter, or whether there is novelty, or whether there was anticipation or matters of that kind.	**Viscount Cave, Lord Chancellor**; Viscount Haldane; Lord Atkinson; Lord Parmoor; Lord Justice Warrington	Appeal dismissed, with variation to formal order	Supreme Court of Canada
The Ship "Steel Scientist" v. H.M. Wrangell and Company, A/S.	[1926] UKPC 72	"In this case, in which the ship 'Steel Scientist' came into collision with the steamship 'Augvald' in the Harbour of Vancouver on the morning of the 29th of November 1923, the Local Judge in Admiralty absolved the 'Steel Scientist' from liability, but the President of the Exchequer Court, who heard the case with the assistance of two nautical assessors, reversed this decision, and found the 'Steel Scientist' alone to blame for the collision. It is from this decision that the present appeal is brought.	Present at the Hearing: The Lord Chancellor; **Lord Phillimore**; Lord Justice Warrington Nautical Assessors: Admiral Sir R. Nelson Ommanney, K.B.E; Commander C.A. Smith, C.B.E., R.D., R.N.R.	Appeal dismissed	Exchequer Court of Canada
The Attorney-General of Ontario and others v. The McLean Gold Mines, Limited	[1926] UKPC 74	"At the threshold of this case lies the important question whether the claim asserted by the plaintiff (respondents) in this action should not rather have been made the subject of a petition of right."	Viscount Haldane; Viscount Dunedin; Lord Atkinson; Lord Justice Warrington; **Chief Justice Anglin**	Appeal allowed	Ontario Supreme Court (Appellate Division)
The Toronto Hockey Club, Limited v. The Arena Gardens of Toronto, Limited	[1926] UKPC 80	"In this appeal the only question is as to the amount of the damages to be awarded to the plaintiffs in respect of the breach of a certain contract, the subject-matter of two actions to be presently mentioned. The question of damages was referred to a Master for assessment. He fixed them at $100,000. Orde J. reduced this assessment to $10,000 and his decision was affirmed by the Court of Appeal. The plaintiffs appeal to His Majesty in Council submitting that 'the amount awarded by the Referee was not excessive and should be restored'."	Viscount Haldane; Lord Atkinson; Lord Darling; **Lord Justice Warrington**; Chief Justice Anglin	Appeal dismissed	Ontario Supreme Court (Appellate Division)
The Minister of Finance v. Cecil R. Smith	[1926] UKPC 81	"This is an appeal from a judgment of the Supreme Court of Canada which had reversed the judgment of the Exchequer Court. The decision of the Exchequer Court, which was that of Audette J., was in answer to a question arising on a special case stated by direction of the Court itself, on an appeal by the respondent under the provisions of the Income War Tax Act, 1917, of the Dominion, as amended by subsequent legislation. This question was raised upon the narrative that the respondent Smith has during the year 1920 gained certain profits within the Province of Ontario by operations in illicit traffic in liquor contrary to the existing Provincial legislation in that respect."	**Viscount Haldane**; Lord Atkinson; Lord Darling; Lord Justice Warrington	Appeal allowed	Supreme Court of Canada
Thomas J. Harrison and Newtown Carman Shaver and others	[1926] UKPC 82	"This is an appeal from the Appellate Division of the Supreme Court of Ontario, allowing an appeal from the judgment of the Hon. Mr. Justice Orde which refused the petition for probate by the plaintiffs–the present appellants–of the will of W.H. Hill deceased. The trial judge held that those propounding the will had failed to prove that it was duly executed by the deceased as the will of a free and capable testator, with fill knowledge and understanding of the contents."	Viscount Haldane; Lord Atkinson; **Lord Darling**; Lord Justice Warrington; Chief Justice Anglin	Appeal dismissed	Ontario Supreme Court (Appellate Division)
Ellen Boland v. The Canadian National Railway Company	[1926] UKPC 85	"A portion of the track of the Canadian National Railway Company, entitled its Newmarket Subdivision, running north and south crossed on the level Bloor Street running east and west in the City of Toronto. In the spring of 1924, the Corporation of the City of Toronto made an application to the Board of the Railway Commissioners for Canada under Section 257 and 259 of the Railways Act of 1919, for an order requiring the Canadian National Railway Company to collaborate with the applicant in the preparation of a joint plan for the separation of gradients on the crossing of Bloor Street, and as to certain other crossing which need to be referred to."	Viscount Haldane; **Viscount Dunedin**; Lord Atkinson; Lord Wrenbury; Lord Justice Warrington	Appeal allowed	Ontario Supreme Court (Appellate Division)
Benjamin Stevenson v. Dame Flora Florant	[1926] UKPC 89	"This is an appeal, brought by special leave of His Majesty in Council, from an order of the Supreme Court of Canada, affirming an order of the Court of King's Bench, Appeal Side, which itself affirmed an order of the Superior Court of Montreal. The last-mentioned order was made upon an application under section 1114 of the Quebec Code of Civil Procedure, and ordered the appellant to surrender to the care and custody of the respondent a child named Gertrude Stevenson, at that time (the 22nd May, 1924) of the age of nine years and six months or thereabouts."	Viscount Cave, Lord Chancellor; Lord Atkinson; Lord Carson; **Lord Justice Warrington**; Sir John Wallis	Appeal dismissed	Supreme Court of Canada
The Makins Produce Company, Incorporated v. The Union Steamship Company of New Zealand, Limited	[1926] UKPC 97	"This action was brought by the appellants against the respondents (defendants) to recover damages alleged to have been sustained to a shipment of eggs, consisting of 950 cases in all which were shipped on board the respondents' steamship 'Makura' at Sydney for carriage to Vancouver and delivery to the appellants or their order."	Viscount Cave, Lord Chancellor; Lord Atkinson; **Lord Carson**; Lord Darling	Appeal dismissed	British Columbia Court of Appeal
Price Brothers and Company, Limited v. La Corporation d'Energie de Montmagny and another	[1927] UKPC 5	"The only question which it is necessary for their Lordships to answer in order to dispose of this appeal arises out of fact which may be stated very briefly." "On 10th October, 1918, certain lots of land on the banks of the Rivière du Sud in Quebec were sold by the predecessors in title of the appellants to Messrs. Rousseau and Hébert for $5,000."	**Viscount Haldane**; Viscount Finlay; Viscount Dunedin; Lord Darling; Lord Warrington of Clyffe	Appeal dismissed	Quebec Court of King's Bench (Appeal Side)
The Corporation Agencies, Limited v. The Home Bank of Canada	[1927] UKPC 6	"The appellants, Corporation Agencies, Limited (hereinafter called the Company), are a limited company incorporated under the statutes of Canada. They carried on business in the city of Montreal as registrar and transfer agents for registering and transferring shares of the capital stock of certain commercial companies and agents and trustee and financial agents in reconstruction of certain companies."	Viscount Haldane; Viscount Finlay; **Lord Wrenbury**; Lord Darling; Lord Warrington of Clyffe	Appeal dismissed	Supreme Court of Canada
The British America Nickel Corporation, Limited, and others v. M.J. O’Brien, Limited	[1927] UKPC 7	"This is an appeal against a judgment of the Court of Appeal of Ontario, affirming the judgment of Kelly, J., by which it was found in favour of the minority of a class of secured debenture holders of the appellant Corporation that the minority were not bound by resolutions passed by the majority of the class of such debenture-holders. The latter had purported to exercise a power conferred on such a majority by the terms of a trust deed. The resolutions in question sought to modify the rights of the debenture-holders as an entire class."	**Viscount Haldane**; Viscount Finlay; Lord Wrenbury; Lord Darling; Lord Warrington of Clyffe	Appeal dismissed	Ontario Supreme Court (Appellate Division)
William Robins v. The National Trust Company, Limited, and others	[1927] UKPC 14	"The late Edward Chandler Walker was at first senior partner of the firm of Walker & Sons, and thereafter when that firm was changed into a limited company was president of Walker & Sons, Limited, whiskey distillers, in Walkerville, Ontario. He was a very wealthy man, married but with no children, and he died on the 11th March, 1915, leaving a widow. He left a will of date 27th February, 1914, and the respondents are the trustees and the principal beneficiaries under the said will. The said will revoked all prior wills. The testator had made a prior will on the 21st December, 1901, under which the appellant is a beneficiary. The present action is at the instance of the appellant to set aside the will of 1914, and restore the will of 1901.	Viscount Finlay; **Viscount Dunedin**; Lord Parmoor; Lord Darling; Lord Warrington of Clyffe	Appeal dismissed	Ontario Supreme Court (Appellate Division)
In the Matter of the Boundary between the Dominion of Canada and the Colony of Newfoundland in the Labrador Peninsula – Between The Dominion of Canada of the One Part and The Colony of Newfoundland of the other Part	[1927] UKPC 25	"The Government of the Dominion of Canada and the Government of the Colony of Newfoundland having petitioned His Majesty to refer to the Judicial Committee of the Privy Council the following question :– 'What is the location and definition of the boundary as between Canada and Newfoundland in the Labrador Peninsula under the Statutes, Orders in Council, and Proclamations?' that question has been referred to this Board under the Statute 3 and 4 Will. IV, c. 4, s. 4, for its consideration and advice."	**Viscount Cave, Lord Chancellor**; Viscount Haldane; Lord Finlay; Lord Warrington of Clyffe; Lord Sumner	Ruling in favour of Newfoundland's description of the boundary of Labrador	Original jurisdiction: Reference question
The Steamship "Hellen" v. The Wm. Donovan Steamship Company (Incorporated)	[1927] UKPC 57	"Shortly after 5 o’clock p.m. on the 10th April, 1924, near the mouth of the river Chehalis in the State of Washington, U.S.A., a collision happened between the motor vessel 'Wm. Donovan' and the S.S. 'Hellen,' as the result of which the 'Hellen' was damaged but slightly, the 'Wm. Donovan much more seriously."	Present at the Hearing: Viscount Haldane; Viscount Sumner; Lord Shaw; Lord Merrivale; **Lord Warrington of Clyffe** Nautical Assessors: Admiral Sir R. Nelson Ommanney, K.B.E; Commander L.W. Bayldon, R.N.R.	Appeal dismissed	Supreme Court of Canada
Capt. J. A. Cates Tug and Wharfage Company, Limited v. The Franklin Fire Insurance Company of Philadelphia, Pennsylvania]	[1927] UKPC 59	"The appellants were the owners of the motor tug boat 'Radius' when she was sunk in collision just outside the entrance to Burrard Inlet, the harbour for the City of Vancouver, on the 26th August, 1925, and went down in about fifteen fathoms. She was covered at the time by two policies of insurance, issued by the respondents, one for $24,000, so valued, on hull ($12,000), and machinery ($12,000), against all risks, and the other on disbursements for $6,000 on the like value, against total or constructive total loss only, with a limited part of any general average and salvage."	Viscount Haldane; **Viscount Sumner**; Lord Shaw; Lord Merrivale; Lord Warrington of Clyffe	Appeal dismissed	British Columbia Court of Appeal
Snia Viscoha Societa Nazionale Industria Applicazioni Viscosa v. The Ship 'Yuri Maru'; -and- The Canadian American Shipping Company, Limited v. The Steamship "Woron"	[1927] UKPC 69	"These appeals are brought against judgments of the Exchequer Court of Canada in Admiralty by plaintiffs who had sued out in the District Court of British Columbia writs in rem and warrants of arrest with a view to the trial at Victoria of claims for damages under charter parties made and alleged to have been broken outside the local area of jurisdiction by parties not resident within that area."	Viscount Haldane; Viscount Sumner; Lord Shaw; **Lord Merrivale**; Lord Warrington of Clyffe	Appeal dismissed	Exchequer Court of Canada
The Attorney-General of British Columbia v. The Canadian Pacific Railway Company	[1927] UKPC 77	"The question which has been decided is concerned with the validity of the British Columbia Fuel-Oil Tax Act, 1923, and especially with Section 3 and Section 6 of that Act. It is contended for the respondents that under Section 92 of the British North America Act there was no power in the Provincial Legislature to pass the statute, the ground being that the taxation attempted is not 'direct'."	**Viscount Haldane**; Lord Atkinson; Lord Blanesburgh; Lord Darling; Lord Warrington of Clyffe	Appeal dismissed	Supreme Court of Canada
The Ontario Jockey Club, Limited v. Samuel McBride	[1927] UKPC 83	"On the 23rd of June, 1922, one Chas. Millar executed in favour of the respondent, McBride, a transfer of one share in the appellant company, the Ontario Jockey Club Limited. The transfer was presented to the company for registration, but registration was refused on the ground that the provisions of the agreement and by-law presently mentioned had not been observed. Thereupon the respondent, on the 24th November, 1923, brought this action to enforce registration."	Viscount Cave, Lord Chancellor; Viscount Haldane; **Lord Wrenbury**; Lord Darling; Lord Warrington of Clyffe	Appeal allowed	Supreme Court of Canada
The Corporation of the City of Toronto and another v. The Consumers' Gas Company of Toronto	[1927] UKPC 88	"By section 7 of a statute of Ontario passed in the year 1887 (50 Vic. c. 85), under which the capital stock of the respondent company was increased to $2,000,000, it was enacted (inter alia) that any surplus of net profit remaining at the close of any fiscal year should, after providing for salaries and dividends, and for the establishment and maintenance of certain specified funds, be applied, in the manner and upon the conditions prescribed by the section, in reduction of the price paid by consumers for gas supplied by the company; and, by the terms of the section, the profit so to be applied was to include 'premiums on sales of stock after the rest or reserve fund shall have been established as aforesaid'."	Viscount Cave, Lord Chancellor; Viscount Haldane; Lord Wrenbury; Lord Warrington of Clyffe; **Mr. Justice Duff**	Appeal dismissed	Ontario Supreme Court (Appellate Division)
The Luscar Collieries, Limited v. N.S. McDonald and others	[1927] UKPC 89	"The appellants, the Luscar Collieries, Limited, are the owners of a short branch line of railway in the Province of Alberta, constructed by them but operated by the Canadian National Railway Company under certain agreements to be mentioned presently. The question in this appeal is whether the appellants' railway is a railway 'within the legislative authority of the Parliament of Canada', and therefore a railway to which the Railway Act, 1919, of Canada applies."	Viscount Haldane; Viscount Sumner; Lord Wrenbury; Lord Darling; **Lord Warrington of Clyffe**	Appeal dismissed	Supreme Court of Canada
The City of Halifax v. The Estate of James P. Fairbanks and another	[1927] UKPC 91	"The substantial question raised in this appeal is whether a tax imposed by the City of Halifax on the estate of John P. Fairbanks as the owner of certain premises in the City is valid, or whether (as the Supreme Court of Canada has held) it is void as not being 'direct taxation' within the meaning of section 92(ii) of the British North America Act.	**Viscount Cave, Lord Chancellor**; Viscount Haldane; Lord Wrenbury; Lord Darling; Lord Warrington of Clyffe	Appeal allowed	Supreme Court of Canada
The Attorney-General of Nova Scotia v. The Legislative Council of Nova Scotia	[1927] UKPC 92	"This appeal, which is brought by leave of the Supreme Court of Nova Scotia, raises some questions of great importance relating to the Constitution of that Province."	**Viscount Cave, Lord Chancellor**; Viscount Haldane; Lord Wrenbury; Lord Warrington of Clyffe; Mr. Justice Duff	Appeal dismissed	Nova Scotia Supreme Court
The Attorney-General of Quebec and the Royal Bank of Canada v. Larue and others	[1928] UKPC 1	"The facts leading up to this litigation are undisputed, and may be very shortly stated. On the 25th March, 1992, the claimant, the Royal Bank of Canada (which will be referred to as 'the Bank'), obtained judgment against one Belanger for $14,036.44 with interest and costs. On the 6th April, 1922, the Bank caused this judgment to be registered in the Registration Division of Quebec, and at the same time caused to be registered (in accordance with Article 2121 of the Civil Code of Quebec) a notice describing certain real estate of the debtor situate in that Division, so establishing a judicial hypothec upon that property resulting from the judgment. On the 11th April, 1922, the Bank registered a second notice describing other real estate of the debtor situate in that Division, to be also affected by the judgment and the judicial hypothec thereby created."	**Viscount Cave, Lord Chancellor**; Lord Buckmaster; Lord Carson; Lord Darling; Lord Warrington of Clyffe	Appeal dismissed	Supreme Court of Canada
Sir Alexandre Lacoste and others v. The Cedars Rapids Manufacturing and Power Company	[1928] UKPC 2	"This is an appeal from an order of the Court of King's Bench of the Province of Quebec (Appeal Side) dated the 22nd October, 1926, setting aside two awards dated the 21st April, 1921, made by arbitrators appointed to fix the amount of compensation to be paid by the respondents to the appellants in respect of two items of property belonging to the appellants, and taken by the respondents in exercise of their statutory powers of expropriation, and referring back to the arbitrators the question of the amount of such compensation."	Viscount Cave, Lord Chancellor; Lord Carson; Lord Darling; Lord Merrivale; **Lord Warrington of Clyffe**	Appeal allowed	Quebec Court of King's Bench (Appeal Side)
Dame Zoe Turgeon since deceased (now represented by Raoul Richard and others) v. The City of Quebec	[1928] UKPC 3	"The plaintiff, Dame Zoe Turgeon, who is now represented by the appellants, in the year 1912 became the owner by purchase of certain lands at a place called Les Saules, situate on either side of the river St. Charles in the Province of Quebec, on which lands her predecessors in title had erected and for many years operated saw and flour mills worked by hydraulic power derived from the river. There is no question that the plaintiff spent a considerable sum of money in improving the mills and machinery and the water power and converted them into a cardboard mill and continued to work the same until the year 1917, when for the reasons stated later the working of the mills was discontinued."	Viscount Cave, Lord Chancellor; Lord Buckmaster; **Lord Carson**; Lord Darling; Lord Warrington of Clyffe	Appeal dismissed	Quebec Court of King's Bench (Appeal Side)
Michael Hirsch and another v. The Protestant Board of School Commissioners of the City of Montreal and others	[1928] UKPC 10	"This appeal, which raises questions of great importance in relation to public education in the Province of Quebec, had its first origin in the decision of the Quebec Superior Court in the case of Pinsler v. The Protestant Board of School Commissioners of Montreal (1903, 23 Q.L.R. 365). In that case Mr. Justice Davidson held, on the construction of the Quebec Education Act of 1899, that a person professing the Jewish faith, not being the owner of real estate inscribed on the Protestant panel for the purposes of the City school tax, could not compel the Protestant School Commissioners to admit his son as of right to a school under their control.	Viscount Cave, Lord Chancellor; Viscount Haldane; Lord Buckmaster; Lord Buckmaster; Lord Darling; **Lord Warrington of Clyffe**	Appeal allowed in part	Supreme Court of Canada
The Banking Service Corporation, Limited, now called Brooks Securities, Limited v. The Toronto Finance Corporation, Limited, and another	[1928] UKPC 23	"Their Lordships do not think it is necessary to call upon the respondents in this case, for, having heard the matter fully argued, they are of opinion that the appeal must fail." "The appellants are a company which organises building mortgage and discount corporations and provides them with capital. In the course of their operations they promoted the respondent company. This latter company was incorporated on the 3rd February, 1921, with a capital of 2,000,000 dollars, divided equally into preference and deferred shares, both the preference and the deferred shares having a face value of 10 dollars apiece."	**Lord Buckmaster**; Lord Shaw; Lord Wrenbury; Lord Blanesburgh; Lord Atkin	Appeal dismissed	Ontario Supreme Court (Appellate Division)
The Dominion Press, Limited v. The Minister of Customs and Excise	[1928] UKPC 39	"In their Lordships' opinion this appeal fails. The question to be determined turns upon the construction to be placed upon two taxing statutes, one passed in 1922, which covers the period down to the 1st January, 1924, and the second passed in 1923, which covers the period after the 1st January, 1924.	**Lord Hailsham, Lord Chancellor**; Viscount Haldane; Lord Buckmaster; Lord Wrenbury; Lord Warrington of Clyffe	Appeal dismissed	Supreme Court of Canada
The Board of Trustees of the Roman Catholic Separate Schools for School Section No. 2 in the Township of Tiny and others v. The King	[1928] UKPC 51	"Their lordships are fully aware that this appeal is among the most important that have come before them from Canada in recent years. It relates to the interpretation of the Constitution of Canada in regard to the separate schools of a large part of her Roman Catholic population, and to the character of the rights conferred on them by the legislative settlement made at the time of Confederation under the British North America Act. So far as concerns the question brought before the Judicial Committee of the Privy Council, it will be found to be a question of pure law, turning on the interpretation and application of words in that Act."	**Viscount Haldane**; Lord Buckmaster; Lord Shaw; Lord Wrenbury; Lord Blanesburgh	Appeal dismissed	Supreme Court of Canada
W.C. Mcdonald, Registered v. Fred Latimer and other	[1928] UKPC 52	"This litigation arises from a series of transaction which their Lordships think are rightly stigmatised as frauds perpetrated by one Deacon upon farmers who were growers of tobacco in Essex County in Ontario in the year 1919."	Viscount Sumner; Lord Shaw; **Lord Atkin**	Appeal allowed	Ontario Supreme Court (Appellate Division)
The King v. The Caledonian Collieries, Limited	[1928] UKPC 55	"The question raised by this appeal is whether the Mine Owners Tax Act, 1923, of the Province of Alberta, which imposes upon mine owners as therein defined a percentage tax upon the gross revenues of their coal mines is ultra vires the Province as an attempt to impose indirect taxation."	Lord Hailsham, Lord Chancellor; Viscount Haldane; Lord Buckmaster; Lord Wrenbury; **Lord Warrington of Clyffe**	Appeal dismissed	Supreme Court of Canada
The Attorney-General of Alberta v. The Attorney-General of Canada	[1928] UKPC 64	"The question raised on these appeals are whether the Crown possesses in the right of the Dominion of Canada the title to (1) escheated lands and (2) bona vacantia within the Province of Alberta. The Supreme Court of Canada has decided the first question in the affirmative and the second in the negative."	Lord Hailsham, Lord Chancellor; Viscount Haldane; **Lord Buckmaster**; Lord Wrenbury; Lord Warrington of Clyffe	Appeal dismissed	Supreme Court of Canada
Dame Hermine Belanger v. Marie Yvonne Henriette Fraser	[1928] UKPC 71	"In this case the appellant sought to recover possession of certain property which she alleged was acquired by her ancestor in the year 1734, and of which the respondent or her predecessors in title are alleged to have been in possession for 170 years." "The respondent by her defence raised the point that she had obtained a prescriptive title by reason of her possession. To that the appellant replied that the prescription did not run because the respondent and her predecessors in title had wrongfully and fraudulently concealed from the appellant and her predecessors the existence of the title deeds and the right which the appellant's ancestor had acquired; therefore, that that fraud prevented the respondent from invoking the doctrine of prescription."	**Lord Hailsham, Lord Chancellor**; Viscount Dunedin; Viscount Sumner; Lord Atkin; Chief Justice Anglin	Appeal dismissed	Quebec Court of King's Bench (Appeal Side)
The Inglewood Pulp and Paper Company Limited v. The New Brunswick Electric Power Commission	[1928] UKPC 72	"This is an appeal from an order of the Appeal Division of the Supreme Court of New Brunswick, dated the 22nd April, 1927, varying in certain particulars, but otherwise affirming an award of Le Blanc, J., sitting as an arbitrator under the New Brunswick Electric Power Act, 1920 (10 Geo. V, c. 53).	Lord Hailsham, Lord Chancellor; Viscount Sumner; **Lord Warrington of Clyffe**; Lord Atkin; Chief Justice Anglin	Appeal dismissed	New Brunswick Supreme Court (Appeal Division)
The Canadian Spool Cotton Company, Limited v. The City of Montreal	[1928] UKPC 78	"This is an appeal from a judgment of the Court of King's Bench (Appeal Side) of the Province of Quebec affirming a judgment of the Recorder of Montreal in an action brought in the Recorder's Court whereby the City of Montreal recovered a sum of $54,419.56, the arrears of municipal taxes for the years 1918, 1919, 1920, with interest."	Lord Hailsham, Lord Chancellor; Viscount Sumner; Lord Warrington of Clyffe; **Lord Atkin**; Chief Justice Anglin	Appeal allowed	Quebec Court of King's Bench (Appeal Side)
The Governor and Company of Adventurers of England Trading into Hudson's Bay v. The Attorney-General of Canada and others	[1928] UKPC 83	"This is an appeal by special leave from the answers given by the Supreme Court of Canada to certain questions referred to them under the provisions of Section 60 of the Supreme Court Act of Canada." "The agreed statement of facts and the questions submitted for decisions were as follows:— '1. By letters patent granted by His late majesty King Charles the Second, bearing date the 2nd day of May, 1670, the Company was granted the lands and territories as therein described, also the gold and silver to be found or discovered therein and other rights, etc., the whole as more fully described in said letters patent'."	**Lord Hailsham, Lord Chancellor**; Lord Buckmaster; Viscount Dunedin; Viscount Sumner; Lord Atkin	Appeal dismissed	Supreme Court of Canada
The Pope Appliance Corporation v. The Spanish River Pulp and Paper Mills, Limited	[1928] UKPC 90	"The present action is directed against an infringement of a Canadian patent, 192726 of 1919, which is owned by the appellants. There were originally two actions brought, one against the present respondents, the Spanish River Pulp Company, and the other against a company called the Abitibi Company. The cases were tried together, and the evidence in each admitted in the other."	Lord Hailsham, Lord Chancellor; **Viscount Dunedin**; Viscount Sumner; Lord Darling; Lord Atkin	Appeal allowed	Supreme Court of Canada
The Attorney-General of Manitoba and another v. The Attorney General of Canada and another	[1928] UKPC 103	"By Order in Council dated the 4th June, 1927, two questions were referred to the Court of Appeal of Manitoba for hearing and consideration, and in due course the Court of Appeal, following the decision of the Supreme Court of Canada in Lukey v. Ruthenian Farmers' Elevator Company, Limited (1924, S.C.R., p. 56), returned the answer 'No' to both questions, but gave leave to appeal to His Majesty in Council. In effect, therefore, the present appeal, brought pursuant to that leave, is an appeal against Lukey's case above mentioned."	Viscount Hailsham, Lord Chancellor; Viscount Dunedin; **Viscount Sumner**; Lord Atkin; Chief Justice Anglin	Appeal dismissed	Manitoba Court of Appeal
The Canadian Performing Right Society Limited v. The Famous Players Canadian Corporation, Limited	[1929] UKPC 9	"The appellants, the plaintiffs in the action, are the owners by assignment of the performing rights in Canada of a very large number of musical works, the copyright in which is still subsisting. The action in which the present appeal arises was an action under the Copyright Act 1921, of Canada, against the respondents for an injunction and damages in respect of the infringement by the respondents of the exclusive performing rights in Canada of two of the said musical pieces."	Viscount Hailsham, Lord Chancellor; Lord Buckmaster; Viscount Sumner; Lord Blanesburgh; **Lord Warrington of Clyffe**	Appeal dismissed	Ontario Supreme Court (Appellate Division)
The Maine and New Brunswick Electrical Power Company, Limited v. Alice M. Hart	[1929] UKPC 46	"In this case the defendants in the action are appealing from a judgment of the Appeal Division of the Supreme Court of New Brunswick, dated the 26th March, 1928. By that judgment the Appeal Division (1) dismissed an appeal of the defendants from a judgment against them for $28,000 without interest, given by the King's Bench Division of the Supreme Court of New Brunswick, on the 20th October, 1927, and (2) allowed a cross appeal of the plaintiff, thereby increasing the amount recoverable against the defendants by $9,083.88 in respect of interest.	Viscount Hailsham, Lord Chancellor; Lord Carson; Lord Blanesburgh; Lord Atkin; **Lord Tomlin**	Appeal allowed in part	New Brunswick Supreme Court (Appeal Division)
Benjamin F. Groat v. The Hydro-Electric Commission of Ontario	[1929] UKPC 55	"Their Lordships do not desire to hear counsel for the respondents on this appeal. When the case is examined, in the opinion of the Board, it is clear that the judgment appealed from cannot be disturbed. The appellant, who was a hydraulic engineer, realised that it might be possible so to interfere with the sub-surface flow of a river as to enable water to be taken from a main stream into an outlet in such a way as to keep it free from ice; in other words, if the flow were arrested at the bottom and accelerated on the surface, and the intake drawn from the bottom, jamming and construction that was due to the gathering of ice floes in the early months of the year might be avoided."	**Lord Buckmaster**; Viscount Dunedin; Lord Warrington of Clyffe	Appeal dismissed	Ontario Supreme Court (Appellate Division)
Eugene Berthiaume v. Dame Anne-Maria Yvonne Dastous	[1929] UKPC 73	"In 1913 the respondent, a French Canadian of the Roman Catholic faith, being then a girl 19 years of age who had just graduated from a convent in a small town in Montreal, went on a trip to Europe with her father. She there met the appellant, a member of a Quebec family and also of the Roman Catholic faith, who had been living in Paris for several years. He proposed marriage to her, and she accepted. The appellant asked the respondent to make the necessary arrangements, and she called on the curé of the parish where her fiancé had been residing and where she was then temporarily residing. The curé informed her that there were certain civil formalities to be gone through and that he would celebrate the marriage."	**Viscount Dunedin**; Lord Darling; Lord Warrington of Clyffe; Mr. Justice Duff; Sir Lancelot Sanderson	Appeal allowed	Quebec Court of King's Bench (Appeal Side)
E.S. & A. Robinson, Limited v. The Wayagamack Pulp and Paper Company, Limited	[1929] UKPC 77	"This is an appeal by the plaintiffs in the action from a decision of the Court of King's Bench (in appeal) of the Province of Quebec, Canada, dated the 20th April, 1927, by which a judgment of the Superior Court for the District of Three Rivers in the said Province in favour of the plaintiffs, dated the 24th of December, 1925, was set aside and the action dismissed with costs."	Viscount Dunedin; Lord Darling; Lord Warrington of Clyffe; Mr. Justice Duff; **Sir Lancelot Sanderson**	Appeal allowed	Quebec Court of King's Bench (Appeal Side)
In the Matter of a Reference as to the Constitutional Validity of certain Sections of the Fisheries Act, 1914 — The Attorney-General of Canada v. The Attorney-General of British Columbia and others	[1929] UKPC 80	"This is an appeal from a judgment dated the 28th May, 1928, of the Supreme Court of Canada. The appellant is the Attorney-General of the Dominion of Canada. The respondents are the Attorneys-General of the Provinces of British Columbia, Quebec and Ontario and the fishermen of Japanese origin in the Province of British Columbia."	Lord Sankey, Lord Chancellor; Lord Darling; **Lord Tomlin**; Lord Thankerton; Sir Lancelot Sanderson	Appeal dismissed	Supreme Court of Canada
The Dominion Building Corporation, Limited v. The King	[1929] UKPC 82	"The main question in this appeal from a judgment of the Supreme Court of Canada relates to the validity of a reference made on 16th September, 1926, by the Acting Minister of Railways and Canals bearing to be made by virtue of Section 38 of the Exchequer Court Act (R.S. Canada, 1906, c. 140) ..."	Lord Sankey, Lord Chancellor; Lord Darling; Lord Warrington of Clyffe; Lord Tomlin; **Lord Thankerton**	Appeal allowed	Supreme Court of Canada
The Canadian General Electric Company, Limited v. Fada Radio, Limited	[1929] UKPC 83	"The action in which the present appeal arises is one for the infringement of the Canadian Patent No. 208,583, the application for which was made on the 17th September, 1920. The application was made by the inventor, Ernest Alexanderson. The Patent was dated the 15th February, 1921, and was granted to the present appellants as assignees of Alexanderson."	Lord Buckmaster; Viscount Dunedin; **Lord Warrington of Clyffe**	Appeal allowed	Supreme Court of Canada
Daniel Eugene Lecavalier v. The City of Montreal	[1929] UKPC 84	"This is an appeal from a judgment dated the 14th January, 1929, of the Court of King's Bench (Appeal Side) for the Province of Quebec, whereby that Court reversed a judgment dated the 10th of March, 1927, of the Quebec Superior Court in favour of the appellant and dismissed his action with costs. The action was commenced on the 30th June, 1923, the appellant being the plaintiff and the City of Montreal being the defendants."	Lord Sankey, Lord Chancellor; Lord Darling; **Lord Warrington of Clyffe**; Lord Tomlin; Lord Thankerton	Appeal dismissed	Quebec Court of King's Bench (Appeal Side)
The Corporation of the City of St. Catharines v. The Hydro-Electric Power Commission of Ontario	[1929] UKPC 85	"This is an appeal from a judgment dated the 5th April, 1928, of the Appellate Division of the Supreme Court of Ontario, dismissing the appeal of the appellant (who is the plaintiff in the action) against the judgment dated the 15th December, 1927, of the trial Judge, Mr. Justice Logie. The action was begun by the appellant on the 21st April, 1927."	Lord Sankey, Lord Chancellor; Lord Darling; Lord Merrivale; **Lord Tomlin**; Mr. Justice Duff	Appeal allowed	Ontario Supreme Court (Appellate Division)
Edwards v. Canada (Attorney General)	[1929] UKPC 86	"By section 24 of the British North America Act, 1867, it is provided that 'The Governor General shall from time to time, in the Queen's name, by instrument under the Great Seal of Canada, summon qualified persons to the Senate; and, subject to the provisions of this Act, every person so summoned shall become and be a Member of the Senate and a Senator.' The question at issue in this appeal is whether the words 'qualified persons' in that section include a woman, and consequently whether women are eligible to be summoned to and become members of the Senate of Canada.	**Lord Sankey, Lord Chancellor**; Lord Darling; Lord Merrivale; Lord Tomlin; Sir Lancelot Sanderson	Appeal allowed	Supreme Court of Canada
John Stirrett and Sons Limited v. The Kaministiquia Power Company, Limited	[1929] UKPC 87	"This is an appeal from the judgment of the Supreme Court of Ontario, by which the judgment of Kelly J. in favour of the appellants and against the respondents was recalled and the appellants' action dismissed. The appellants are a lumbering company, operating under licences from the Government of the Province of Ontario certain tracts of timber adjacent to Big Dog Lake in the District of Thunder Bay."	Viscount Dunedin; Viscount Sumner; Lord Blanesburgh; **Lord Thankerton**	Appeal dismissed	Ontario Supreme Court (Appellate Division)
The Royal Trust Company v. The Attorney-General of Alberta	[1929] UKPC 93	"The question for determination in this case is whether certain bonds of the Dominion of Canada, of which at the time of his death William Roper Hull, late of the City of Calgary, was owner, are within the meaning of the Succession Duties Act (Revised Statutes of Alberta, 1922) property of his, passing on his death, which was at the time of his death 'situate within the province' and subject therefore to the duties prescribed by the statute."	Lord Sankey, Lord Chancellor; Lord Darling; **Lord Merrivale**; Lord Tomlin; Sir Lancelot Sanderson	Appeal dismissed	Alberta Supreme Court (Appellate Division)
The Erie Beach Company, Limited v. The Attorney-General of Ontario	[1929] UKPC 100	"The Erie Beach Company, Limited, appeals against the judgment of the Appellate Division of the Supreme Court in an action upon an agreed statement of facts wherein the Company prayed a declaration that certain shares of its capital stock registered in the name of Frank V. E. Bardol, deceased, and other like shares allotable to him under a contract of his with the Company were not upon his death subject to duty under the Ontario Succession Duty Act; a declaration that the Company is not under Section 10 of the Act liable to pay duty in respect of a transfer of such shares permitted by the Company before payment of succession duty thereon or security given for the payment of the same; and a declaration that Section 10 of the Act in so far as it purports to impose the last-mentioned duty on the Company is ultra vires of the Province of Ontario.	Lord Sankey, Lord Chancellor; Lord Darling; **Lord Merrivale**; Lord Tomlin; Mr. Justice Duff	Appeal dismissed	Ontario Supreme Court (Appellate Division)
Chung Chuck and others v. Rex and others	[1929] UKPC 113	"These are consolidated appeals from a judgment of the Court of Appeal of British Columbia, and they arise out of the prosecutions instituted against the appellants for offences against the Produce Marketing Act (Statutes of British Columbia, 1926/27, Chapter 54), as amended by the Produce Marketing Act Amendment Act (Statutes of British Columbia, 1928, Chapter 39), and certain regulations and orders made thereunder."	**Lord Sankey, Lord Chancellor**; Lord Merrivale; Lord Atkin; Lord Thankerton; Lord Russell of Killowen	Appeal dismissed	British Columbia Court of Appeal

== Summary by year and result ==
Year	Number of Cases	Appeal Allowed		Appeal Dismissed	
1920	19	10	52.6%	9	47.4%
1921	17	6	35.3%	11	64.7%
1922 (Note: In one case in this year, the parties settled the case before the Judicial Committee rendered a decision: Foley Brothers and others v. James A McIlwee and others, [1922] UKPC 18. The case is not included in the statistics.)	18	7	38.9%	11	61.1%
1923	19	6	31.6%	13	68.4%
1924	17	9	52.9%	8	47.1%
1925	18	9	50.0%	9	50.0%
1926	21	8	38.1%	13	61.9%
1927 (Note: One case this year was a direct reference by the British government, on the joint request of the governments of Canada and Newfoundland: In the Matter of the Boundary between the Dominion of Canada and the Colony of Newfoundland in the Labrador Peninsula, [1927] UKPC 25. Since it was not an appeal, it is not included in the statistics for appeals allowed and dismissed.)	14	2	14.3%	11	78.6%
1928	16	5	31.3%	11	68.7%
1929	15	7	46.7%	8	53.3%
Total Cases	174	69	39.7%	104	59.8%
Yearly Averages	17.4	6.9		10.4	

== Summary by jurisdiction and court appealed from ==
Jurisdiction	Number of Cases	On Appeal from Supreme Court of Canada		On Appeal from Other Courts	
Original Jurisdiction (Reference Question) (Note: One case was a direct reference by the British government, on the joint request of the governments of Canada and Newfoundland: In the Matter of the Boundary between the Dominion of Canada and the Colony of Newfoundland in the Labrador Peninsula, [1927] UKPC 25. It is not included in the totals of appeals from the Supreme Court or other courts.)	1	—	0.0%	—	0.0%
Federal	26	22	84.6%	4	15.4%
Ontario	40	5	12.5%	35	87.5%
Quebec	53	18	34.0%	35	66.0%
Nova Scotia	8	3	37.5%	5	62.5%
New Brunswick	4	0	0.0%	4	100.0%
Manitoba	5	1	20.0%	4	80.0%
British Columbia	23	6	26.1%	17	73.9%
Prince Edward Island	0	0	0.0%	0	0.0%
Saskatchewan	3	0	0.0%	3	100.0%
Alberta	10	4	40.0%	6	60.0%
North-West Territories	0	0	0.0%	0	0.0%
Yukon	1	0	0.0%	1	100.0%
Total	174	59	33.9%	114	65.5%

== See also ==
- List of Canadian appeals to the Judicial Committee of the Privy Council, 1867–1869
- List of Canadian appeals to the Judicial Committee of the Privy Council, 1870–1879
- List of Canadian appeals to the Judicial Committee of the Privy Council, 1880–1889
- List of Canadian appeals to the Judicial Committee of the Privy Council, 1890–1899
- List of Canadian appeals to the Judicial Committee of the Privy Council, 1900–1909
- List of Canadian appeals to the Judicial Committee of the Privy Council, 1910–1919
- List of Canadian appeals to the Judicial Committee of the Privy Council, 1930–1939
- List of Canadian appeals to the Judicial Committee of the Privy Council, 1940–1949
- List of Canadian appeals to the Judicial Committee of the Privy Council, 1950–1959

== Sources ==
- British and Irish Legal Information Institute: Privy Council Decisions
- 1920 Privy Council Decisions
- 1921 Privy Council Decisions
- 1922 Privy Council Decisions
- 1923 Privy Council Decisions
- 1924 Privy Council Decisions
- 1925 Privy Council Decisions
- 1926 Privy Council Decisions
- 1927 Privy Council Decisions
- 1928 Privy Council Decisions
- 1929 Privy Council Decisions
