= Ponoka-Calmar Oils v Wakefield =

Last Canadian appeal to the Judicial Committee

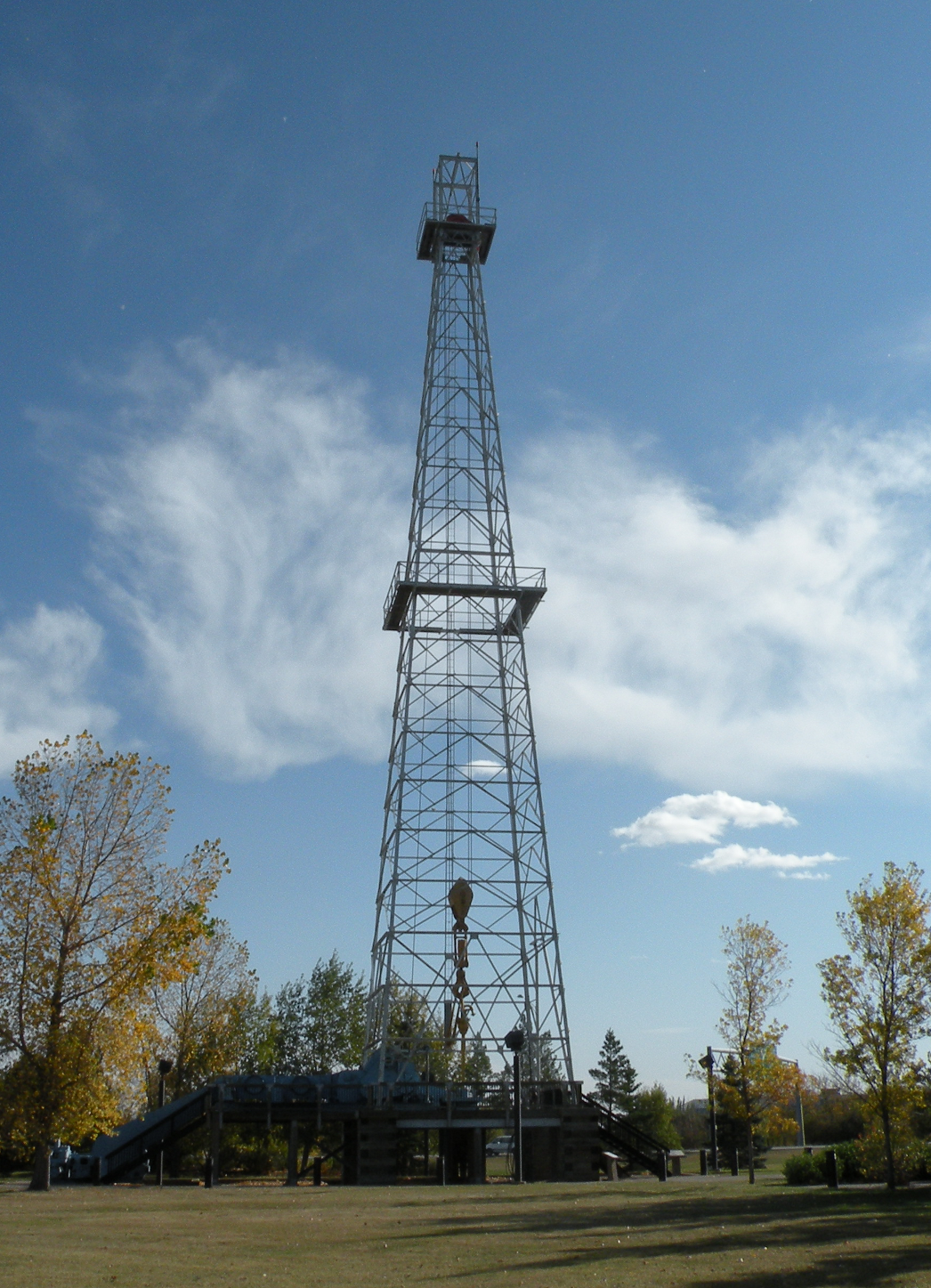
- Court: Judicial Committee of the Privy Council
- Full case name: Ponoka-Calmar Oils Ltd. and another v Earl F. Wakefield Co. And others
- Decided: 7 October 1959
- Citation: [1959] UKPC 20, [1960] AC 18

Case history
- Appealed from: Earl F. Wakefield Company v. Oil City Petroleums (Leduc) Ltd. et al., 1958 CanLII 46, [1958] SCR 361 (22 April 1958), Supreme Court (Canada)

Court membership
- Judges sitting: Viscount Simonds, Lord Reid, Lord Radcliffe, Lord Tucker, Lord Denning

Case opinions
- Decision by: Viscount Simonds

Keywords
- mechanic's liens

Ponoka-Calmar Oils v Wakefield is notable for being the last ruling rendered by the Judicial Committee of the Privy Council with respect to an appeal from the courts of Canada. The central issue concerned the construction of statutes relating to mechanic's liens and how they attach to land and the oil and gas severed from it, which issue had generated conflicting rulings in the Canadian courts.

== Background ==
Earl F. Wakefield Company had entered into an arrangement with Harding and McMullen and commenced drilling an oil well before 10 September 1949. On 19 September, Harding and McMullen incorporated Oil City Petroleums (Leduc) Ltd., which entered into a formal contract with Wakefield on the matter. On 24 September, Oil City entered into an agreement with other companies (including the assignee of the oil lease in the property) and H. and M., therein described as "agents", wherein it was recited that the latter "have assisted in arranging for the drilling of the said wells" and Oil City covenanted to "commence to drill or cause to be commenced to be drilled" the well which had in fact been commenced by the plaintiff. Drilling was suspended on 23 September by Wakefield because of non-payment by Oil City, and Wakefield registered mechanic's liens in October 1949 and commenced actions within the time limit prescribed.

About three months after the cessation of work, arrangements were made with others under which the well was completed and brought into production. In June 1950, a receiver was appointed to sell the oil won, and, subject to stated deductions, to deposit the proceeds in a special trust account to the credit of the action. The plaintiff's action did not come to trial until more than six years had elapsed from the registration of the lien, and no renewal statement had been filed as required by what was then s. 29(7) of The Mechanics' Lien Act of Alberta.

== The courts below ==
In the Trial Division of the Supreme Court of Alberta, McLaurin C.J.T.D. held that the lien was valid, and duly entered judgment against all defendants. On appeal to the Appellate Division, the judgment was reversed. In the majority ruling by Porter J.A., it was held that there was no evidence that disclosed facts that supported the plaintiff's entitlement to any of the moneys held by the trustee. A concurring ruling by McBride and Johnson JJ.A. held that if such liens did arise they had ceased to exist before the date of the trial of the action, by reason of the failure of the appellant to file a renewal statement as required by the act.

The Appellate Division's ruling was overturned on appeal to the Supreme Court of Canada, which held:

- unanimously that a valid lien in favour of the plaintiff arose in 1949 for the value of the work actually done
- by 3-2 that, while the lien on the land ceased to exist because of the failure to file the necessary renewal statement before the expiration of six years, the transferred lien or charge on the moneys in the hands of the receiver was not affected by this failure

Ponoka-Calmar Oils Ltd. and American Leduc Petroleums Limited were assignees of some of the oil leases on which drilling had taken place, and were respondents in the action at hand. They appealed the issue of their liability in the matter to the Judicial Committee of the Privy Council.

== Ruling by the Privy Council ==
In a ruling delivered by Viscount Simonds, it was held that the SCC's ruling was correct. Because of the nature of the agreements that had been executed, both appellants were considered to be "owners" within the meaning of the Alberta statute, and were thus included within the liability for the liens that had attached.
