= Gavin Simonds, 1st Viscount Simonds =

British barrister and Viscount

The Right Honourable The Viscount Simonds PC
- 1953 photograph of Simonds by Sir Cecil Beaton

Lord Chancellor
- In office 30 October 1951 – 18 October 1954
- Monarchs: George VI; Elizabeth II
- Prime Minister: Sir Winston Churchill
- Preceded by: The Viscount Jowitt
- Succeeded by: The Viscount Kilmuir

Personal details
- Born: 28 November 1881 Reading, Berkshire
- Died: 28 June 1971 (aged 89) Westminster, London
- Party: Conservative
- Education: New College, Oxford

Gavin Turnbull Simonds, 1st Viscount Simonds, PC (28 November 1881 – 28 June 1971) was a British judge, politician and Lord High Chancellor of Great Britain.

== Background and education ==
Simonds was born in Reading, Berkshire, the son of Louis DeLuze Simonds and his wife, Mary Elizabeth Turnbull. They were members of a well-known Berkshire family of brewing magnates (see H & G Simonds Ltd). He was educated at Winchester College (where he was later a Fellow, and Warden from 1946 to 1951) and at New College, Oxford.

== Legal and political career ==
Simonds was called to the bar in 1906, and appointed a King's Counsel in 1924. He was elected a Bencher of Lincoln's Inn in 1929 and was Treasurer from 1951. He served as a Judge of the Chancery Division of the High Court of Justice between 1937, when he was knighted, and 1944. In the latter year he was appointed a Lord of Appeal in Ordinary, sworn of the Privy Council and created a life peer as Baron Simonds, of Sparsholt in the County of Southampton, being introduced into the House of Lords on 18 April 1944.

Simonds remained a Law Lord until 1951, when Winston Churchill appointed him Lord Chancellor. He was holder of the office at the time of the Coronation of Queen Elizabeth II, adding a major ceremonial role to his judicial one.

In June 1952 he was made a hereditary peer as Baron Simonds, of Sparsholt in the County of Southampton, being introduced to the House of Lords again on 25 June 1952. This was his title until 1954, when he was created Viscount Simonds, of Sparsholt in the County of Southampton, and customarily re-introduced to the House of Lords with his higher title on 3 November 1954. He again served as a Lord of Appeal in Ordinary from 1954 to 1962. He was also High Steward of Oxford University from 1954 to 1967, and High Steward of the City of Winchester from 1951.

== Family ==
Lord Simonds had three sons, all of whom predeceased him. Robert Francis Simonds died in infancy; John Mellor Simonds (1915–1944) was killed in action at Arnhem in 1944, and Gavin Alexander Simonds (1915–1951) died as a result of illness contracted on active service in East Africa in 1951. Consequently, the hereditary barony and viscountcy became extinct on his death in June 1971, aged 89.

== Arms ==
Coat of arms of Gavin Simonds, 1st Viscount Simonds
Crest An ermine Proper resting the sinister paw upon the astronomical sign of Taurus Sable and holding in the mouth a trefoil slipped Or. Escutcheon Tierced in pall Azure, Gules and Vert three Trefoils slipped Or Supporters On either side an ermine Proper each charged on the shoulder the dexter with an hop leaf and the sinister with a bezant. Motto Simplex Munditiis

Political offices
Preceded by The Viscount Jowitt	Lord High Chancellor of Great Britain; 1951–1954	Succeeded by The Viscount Kilmuir
Peerage of the United Kingdom
New creation	Viscount Simonds; 1954–1971	Extinct
New creation	Baron Simonds; 1952–1971	Extinct
