= James Tucker, Baron Tucker =

British judge

The Right Honourable The Lord Tucker PC
- Tucker in 1940 by Walter Stoneman

Lord of Appeal in Ordinary
- In office 1950–1961

Lord Justice of Appeal
- In office 1945–1950

Justice of the High Court
- In office 1937–1945

Personal details
- Born: Frederick James Tucker Pietermaritzburg, Colony of Natal

Frederick James Tucker, Baron Tucker PC was a British judge.

Tucker was born in Pietermaritzburg, Colony of Natal (now South Africa), and was educated at Winchester College and at New College, Oxford. He was called to the Bar (Inner Temple) in 1914, and was commissioned into the British Army as a lieutenant during World War I. After the war, he became the pupil of Rayner Goddard (later Lord Goddard) and joined his chambers. He was made King's Counsel in 1933.

He was recorder of Southampton in 1936–37, and was a Justice of the King's Bench Division of the High Court between 1937 and 1945, receiving the customary knighthood upon his appointment. In 1945, Tucker presided over the trial of William Joyce (Lord Haw Haw) for treason at the Central Criminal Court.

Invested as a Privy Councillor on 30 October 1945, Tucker was Lord Justice of Appeal from 1945 to 1950, became an honorary fellow of New College, Oxford in 1946. He was appointed Lord of Appeal in Ordinary 29 September 1950, and was created a life peer with the title Baron Tucker of Great Bookham in the County of Surrey.
