= List of Canadian appeals to the Judicial Committee of the Privy Council, 1930–1939 =

List of Canadian appeals to the JCPC (1930–1939)

This page lists all cases of the Judicial Committee of the Privy Council originating in Canada, and decided in the years 1930 to 1939.

From 1867 to 1949, the JCPC was the highest court of appeal for Canada (and, separately, for Newfoundland). During this period, its decisions on Canadian appeals were binding precedent on all Canadian courts, including the Supreme Court of Canada. Any decisions from this era that the Supreme Court of Canada has not overruled since gaining appellate supremacy in 1949 remain good law, and continue to bind all Canadian courts other than the Supreme Court.

The Parliament of Canada abolished appeals to the JCPC of criminal cases in 1933 and civil cases in 1949. Ongoing cases that had begun before those dates remained appealable to the JCPC. The final JCPC ruling on a Canadian case was rendered in 1959, in Ponoka-Calmar Oils v Wakefield.

== Case list ==
Case name	Citation	Subject (Exact text from judgment)	Judges (Author of decision in bold)	Appeal allowed or dismissed	On appeal from
James Richardson and Sons, Limited and another v. The Ship "Robert J. Paisley"	[1930] UKPC 5	"The collision in question took place on January 18th, 1927, while the s.s. 'Saskatchewan', the appellants' vessel, was lying moored, outside ship in a tier, at a slip in a recessed area at the west side of Owen Sound. The 'Paisley' is a steel s.s. of 3,762 tons gross register, 3,130 net, 360 feet length, 50 feet beam, and 28 feet depth, registered in the United States; the 'Saskatchewan' is a steel s.s. of 1,860 tons gross register, 1,089 net, 266 feet long and of 38 feet beam. The Sound is a deep and narrow inlet of Lake Huron. It has natural advantages of situation and form for the heavy cargo traffic of the Great Lakes, and at the time in question was undergoing development as a harbour.	Lord Sankey, Lord Chancellor; **Lord Merrivale**; Lord Atkin; Lord Thankerton; Lord Russell of Killowen	Appeal allowed	Supreme Court of Canada
The Attorney-General of British Columbia v. The McDonald Murphy Lumber Company, Limited	[1930] UKPC 26	"The controversy in this appeal relates to the validity of an enactment of the Legislature of the Province of British Columbia imposing a tax on timber cut within the Province."	Lord Blanesburgh; Lord Merrivale; Lord Tomlin; Lord Russell of Killowen; **Lord Macmillan**	Appeal dismissed	British Columbia Supreme Court
Elizabeth Bethune Campbell v. William Drummond Hogg and others	[1930] UKPC 39	On the 18th December, 1884 Mr. James Bethune, K.C., died at Toronto, leaving his wife, Elizabeth Mary Bethune, one son, Charles, and four daughters surviving him. The children were then in infancy. Two of them have since died—Charles in April, 1921, one of the daughters some years earlier. The three other daughters—who are now Mrs. Lindsay, Mrs. McDougald and Mrs. Campbell—are still living. Mrs. Campbell, the youngest of the three, is the present appellant.	**Lord Blanesburgh**; Lord Tomlin; Lord Russell of Killowen	Appeal allowed	Ontario Supreme Court (Appellate Division)
Harold Ferguson Fishleigh and another v. The London Western Trusts Company, Limited and others	[1930] UKPC 51	"These appeals raise for decision questions of the true construction of the will and codicils and Thomas Saunders Hobbs. The testator was a bachelor. At the date of his will he had 5 sisters living of whom four were married, viz., Mrs. Field, Mrs. Ferguson, Mrs. Fishleigh and Mrs. Puddicombe. Mrs. Ferguson was the only married sister who had no children. Mrs. Fishleigh had 2 sons alive, viz., Ernest Claude Fishleigh and William Thomas Albert Fishleigh. In these circumstances the testator executed his will which bears date the 19th March 1902."	Viscount Dunedin; Lord Darling; Lord Atkin; **Lord Russell of Killowen**; Lord Macmillan	Appeal allowed in part	Ontario Supreme Court (Appellate Division)
The Trustees of St. Luke’s Presbyterian Congregation of Saltsprings and others v. Alexander Cameron and others	[1930] UKPC 54	"Profiting by the experience of the Presbyterian Churches which united in Scotland in 1900 the Canadian churches which proposed to unite in 1925 adopted the safer course of invoking in advance the sanction of the legislature to their union. They have, nevertheless, not been entirely successful, as the present appeal shows, in avoiding the pitfalls which seem to lie in the path of all legislative efforts to deal with ecclesiastical affairs."	Viscount Dunedin; Lord Blanesburgh; Lord Darling; Lord Atkin; **Lord Macmillan**	Appeal dismissed	Supreme Court of Canada
William Robert Patton v. The Toronto General Trust Corporation and others	[1930] UKPC 61	"The issue raised by this appeal is concerned with gifts of two annuities, one immediate and the other reversionary, made to the appellant by the will of his grandfather, William Robert Patton, formerly of the City Toronto. The Courts of Ontario have held – the Appellate Division, however, being equally divided on the question – that the appellant has lost both annuities by reason of his failure to comply with what the learned Judges have considered to be a condition precedent to the enjoyment of either – namely, that at the date of the testator’s will, or, alternatively, at the date of his death, the appellant should, amongst other things, have been and should have proved himself to be of the Lutheran religion. Hence this appeal by him."	Viscount Dunedin; **Lord Blanesburgh**; Lord Darling; Lord Atkin; Lord Macmillan	Appeal allowed	Ontario Supreme Court (Appellate Division)
T.H. Hancock v. The Imperial Bank of Canada	[1930] UKPC 62	"The appellant in this case is a gentleman who signed a letter of guarantee for advances to be made to the business of a Mr. Garlock. The action is one by the Bank, in whose favour he signed the letter of guarantee, for advances made. There is no question that the advances were made, and it cannot be disputed that upon the terms of the letter of guarantee itself those terms covered the advances."	**Viscount Dunedin**; Lord Blanesburgh; Lord Darling; Lord Russell of Killowen; Chief Justice Anglin	Appeal dismissed	Ontario Supreme Court (Appellate Division)
The Keewatin Power Company, Limited v. The Lake of the Woods Milling Company, Limited	[1930] UKPC 67	"The Lake of the Woods is an enormous expanse of water 1500 square miles in extent. It extends, however, over what is naturally a very flat country so that the outflow from it is not very rapid. The level of the lake naturally varies according to the conditions of rainfall which have prevailed over this large area. The natural outlets to the lake are only two in number which are denominated the western and eastern outlets."	**Viscount Dunedin**; Lord Blanesburgh; Lord Darling; Lord Atkin; Lord Macmillan	Appeal dismissed	Ontario Supreme Court (Appellate Division)
The Bank of Montreal v. The Dominion Gresham Guarantee and Casualty Company	[1930] UKPC 69	"This is an appeal from a judgment dated the 27th May, 1929, of the Supreme Court of Canada, whereby the Court by a majority reversed a judgment of the Court of King’s Bench in appeal and directed judgment for 7,565.61 dollars and costs in all Courts to be entered in favour of the present respondents against the present appellants."	Lord Sankey, Lord Chancellor; Lord Blanesburgh; Lord Darling; **Lord Tomlin**; Lord Russell of Killowen	Appeal dismissed	Supreme Court of Canada
The Canadian Pacific Railway Company and others v. The Toronto Transportation Commission and others	[1930] UKPC 70 [1930] UKPC 71	"These appeals are concerned with the validity of orders pronounced by the Board of Railway Commissioners for Canada whereby the Toronto Transportation Commission was required to contribute to the cost of certain works directed by the Railway Board to be carried out within the City of Toronto. Three quite distinct undertakings are involved, namely, the Bloor Street Subways, the Royce Avenue Subway and the Main Street Bridge."	Lord Sankey, Lord Chancellor; Lord Blanesburgh; Lord Atkin; Lord Russell of Killowen; **Lord Macmillan**	Appeal dismissed	Supreme Court of Canada
William Young v. The Canadian Northern Railway Company	[1930] UKPC 94	"In this case the appellant, who had been in the employ of the respondents (hereinafter called the railway company) as a machinist, sued the railway company for damages for wrongful dismissal and for other relief."	Viscount Dunedin; Lord Blanesburgh; Lord Tomlin; **Lord Russell of Killowen**; Chief Justice Anglin	Appeal dismissed	Manitoba Court of Appeal
The Steel Company of Canada, Limited, and others v. Thomas Ramsay and another	[1930] UKPC 103	"The Steel Company of Canada are a company incorporated by letters patent under the Companies Act of Canada."	**Viscount Dunedin**; Lord Blanesburgh; Lord Atkin; Lord Thankerton; Lord Russell of Killowen	Appeal dismissed	Ontario Supreme Court (Appellate Division)
The Fort Frances Pulp and Paper Company, Limited v. The Spanish River Pulp and Paper Mills, Limited, and others	[1930] UKPC 104	"The question at issue results from the control over the supply and prices of newsprint throughout the Dominion established on the 16th April, 1917 for the duration of the war."	**Lord Blanesburgh**; Lord Merrivale; Lord Atkin; Lord Russell of Killowen; Lord Macmillan	Appeal allowed	Ontario Supreme Court (Appellate Division)
Charles E. Campbell v. The National Trust Company, Limited, executors of E.A. Wallberg, deceased	[1930] UKPC 105	"In this case the appellant, Campbell, sued one Wallberg and a company called the Lake St. John Power and Paper Company Limited (hereinafter called the Lake Company), in the Supreme Court of Ontario, for certain relief, his claim being founded upon an alleged verbal agreement by Wallberg to pay commission.	Lord Blanesburgh; Lord Hanworth; Lord Atkin; **Lord Russell of Killowen**; Sir Lancelot Sanderson	Appeal allowed	Ontario Supreme Court (Appellate Division)
The Steamship "Eurana" v. The Burrard Inlet Tunnel and Bridge Company	[1931] UKPC 2	"This is an appeal from a judgment of the President of the Exchequer Court of Canada dismissing an appeal from the Trial Judge in Admiralty for the Admiralty district of British Columbia. The action was brought by the Burrard Inlet Tunnel and Bridge Company, the present respondents, hereafter called the Bridge Company, against the owners of the S.S. "Eurana" for damages sustained by the Bridge Company through the ship coming into collision with their bridge over the Second Narrows in the harbour of Vancouver."	Lord Merrivale; **Lord Atkin**; Lord Russell of Killowen; Lord Macmillan; Sir Lancelot Sanderson	Appeal allowed	Exchequer Court of Canada
Proprietary Articles Trade Association v. Attorney General of Canada	[1931] UKPC 11	"This is an appeal from the Supreme Court of Canada on a reference by the Governor in Council under Section 55 of the Supreme Court Act. The questions submitted to the Court were:— (a) Is the Combines Investigation Act R.S.C. 1927, c. 26, ultra vires the Parliament of Canada either in whole or in part, and if so, in what particular or particulars or to what extent? (b) Is Section 498 of the Criminal Code ultra vires the Parliament of Canada, and if so, in what particular or particulars or to what extent?	Lord Blanesburgh; Lord Merrivale; **Lord Atkin**; Lord Russell of Killowen; Lord Macmillan	Appeal dismissed	Supreme Court of Canada
The Canadian Pacific Railway Company v. The King	[1931] UKPC 18	"The object of the proceedings was to obtain the removal from the roadway and lands of the Intercolonial Railway, of the appellant's line of telegraph poles and wires. The Intercolonial Railway forms part of the Canadian Government Railways system, and its roadway lies in the provinces of New Brunswick and Nova Scotia."	Viscount Dunedin; Lord Blanesburgh; Lord Atkin; Lord Thankerton; **Lord Russell of Killowen**	Appeal allowed	Supreme Court of Canada
The Carling Export Brewing and Malting Company, Limited v. The King	[1931] UKPC 19	"The appellant, who carries on the brewery at London, Ontario, is sued by the Crown in the present action for the recovery of (a) $260,662.21 gallonage tax under the provisions of the Special War Revenue Act (1915) 5 George V. cap. 8 and amendments thereto, in respect of beer manufactured and sold by the appellant between the 1st April, 1924 and the 1st May, 1927; (b) $163,828.07 for sales tax under the said statute and amendments in respect of beer sold by the appellant between the same dates; and (c) interest and penalties in respect thereof."	Viscount Dunedin; Lord Blanesburgh; Lord Atkin; **Lord Thankerton**; Lord Russell of Killowen	Appeal allowed in part	Supreme Court of Canada
John A. Rice v. Frits Ricdolf Christani and another	[1931] UKPC 67	"The action out of which this appeal arises was brought by the respondents against the appellant in the Exchequer Court of Canada for a declaration that a patent grant to the appellant (No. 252546) was invalid, null and void."	Lord Sankey, Lord Chancellor; Lord Blanesburgh; **Lord Tomlin**; Lord Russell of Killowen; Sir Lancelot Sanderson	Appeal dismissed	Supreme Court of Canada
Joseph Francis Langer v. McTavish Brothers, Limited	[1931] UKPC 74	"Their Lordships have heard what has been very ably advanced by Counsel on both sides in respect of the respective appeals of these parties. The material questions in the case are two, which were concisely stated by Mr. Lawrence; was the non-disclosure by the plaintiffs of the report made to them by Barnes in the summer of 1927 fraudulent, and was the defendant induced to buy by such fraudulent non-disclosure?"	**Lord Merrivale**; Lord Warrington of Clyffe; Lord Thankerton; Sir John Wallis; Sir George Lowndes	Appeal dismissed	British Columbia Court of Appeal
The Corporation of the County of Lincoln v. The Corporation of the Village of Port Dalhousie	[1931] UKPC 76	"The urban municipality of Port Dalhousie, which is a village situated within the county of Lincoln in the province of Ontario and is not separated from the county for municipal purpose, is subject to an annual general levy by the council of the county for county road purposes."	Lord Sankey, Lord Chancellor; Viscount Dunedin; Lord Hanworth; Lord Russell of Killowen; **Lord Macmillan**	Appeal dismissed	Ontario Supreme Court (Appellate Division)
The Sun Life Assurance Company of Canada v. The Superintendent of Insurance	[1931] UKPC 77	"This is an appeal from a judgment of the Supreme Court which, by a majority, two Judges dissenting, confirmed a judgment of the Judge in the Exchequer Court which confirmed a ruling made by the Superintendent of Insurance as to the authorised capital of the Sun Life Assurance Company, the appellants before this Board. There was, at first, a question as to the jurisdiction of the Supreme Court to consider the judgment of the Exchequer Court Judge, but that question was given up and the only question argued before this Board has been on the merits of the case.	**Viscount Dunedin**; Lord Hanworth; Lord Atkin; Lord Russell of Killowen; Lord Macmillan	Appeal allowed	Supreme Court of Canada
The Attorney-General Ontario v. The National Trust Company, Limited, executors of the will of William Edward Wilder, deceased, and another	[1931] UKPC 87	"The point to be decided in this appeal can be stated quite shortly — Is the value of property, the subject of a gift inter vivos, to be taken for the purpose of succession duty as on the date of the gift, or as on the date of the death of the donor?"	Lord Blanesburgh; Lord Merrivale; **Lord Hanworth**; Lord Atkin; Lord Macmillan	Appeal allowed	Ontario Supreme Court (Appellate Division)
The Attorney-General of Saskatchewan and another v. The Attorney-General of Canada	[1931] UKPC 91	"This appeal from the Supreme Court of Canada arises upon an order of reference pursuant to Section 55 of the Supreme Court Act, made by the Governor-General in Council, dated May 3rd, 1930, to determine questions that had arisen between the Dominion and the Province of Saskatchewan.	Viscount Dunedin; Lord Hanworth; **Lord Atkin**; Lord Russell of Killowen; Lord Macmillan	Appeal dismissed	Supreme Court of Canada
In re Regulation and Control of Aeronautics in Canada — The Attorney-General of Canada v. The Attorney-General of Ontario and others	[1931] UKPC 93	"This appeal raises an important question as between the Dominion and the Provinces of Canada regarding the right to control and regulate aeronautics, including the granting of certificates to persons to act as pilots, the inspection and licensing of aircraft, and the inspection and licensing of aerodromes and air-stations."	**Lord Sankey, Lord Chancellor**; Viscount Dunedin; Lord Atkin; Lord Russell of Killowen; Lord Macmillan	Appeal allowed	Supreme Court of Canada
The Attorney-General of Quebec v. The Attorney-General of Canada	[1931] UKPC 94	"Under one of the provisions of the statutes of Quebec the Lieutenant-Governor in Council may refer to the Court of the King’s Bench for hearing and consideration any question he deems expedient. Acting under that provision and upon the narrative that several foreign or British insurers had obtained licenses under the Quebec Insurance Act and that the Department of Insurance of the Dominion was endeavouring to force these companies to obtain a license under Section 11 and 12 of the Insurance Act of Canada, R.S.C. 1927, c.101, and to recover from persons who insure with these insurers the tax imposed by Sections 16, 20, and 21 of the Special War Revenue Act, R.S.C. 1927, c. 179, the Lieutenant-Governor in Council referred to the Court of King’s Bench the following questions ..."	**Viscount Dunedin**; Lord Blanesburgh; Lord Atkin; Lord Russell of Killowen; Lord Macmillan	Appeal allowed	Quebec Court of King's Bench (Appeal Side)
The Corporation of the City of Toronto v. The King and another	[1931] UKPC 95	"On 24th October, 1924, at a sitting of the High Court Division of the Supreme Court of Ontario held at the city of Toronto, one Aemilius Jarvis, after trial before the Chief Justice of the Common Pleas and a jury, was found guilty of conspiring to defraud the Government of the Province of Ontario and was sentenced to be imprisoned for six months and to pay a fine (as reduced on appeal) of $60,000. The fine was paid to the Senior Registrar of the Supreme Court of Ontario on the 22nd April, 1925. Thereupon, the present appellant, the Corporation of Toronto, founding on the proviso to section 1036(1) of the Criminal Code of Canada, claimed that the fine should be paid over to it."	Viscount Dunedin; Lord Blanesburgh; Lord Atkin; Lord Russell of Killowen; **Lord Macmillan**	Appeal allowed	Ontario Supreme Court (Appellate Division)
Dame Camille Rolland and another v. Stanislas Jean-Baptiste Rolland and others	[1931] UKPC 96	"The appellant (Dame Camille Rolland who with her husband was plaintiff in the action) is one of the grandchildren and the respondents are the surviving children and certain of the other grandchildren of one J.D. Rolland and his wife, including those of them who are at present trustees and executors of his will."	Lord Blanesburgh; Lord Merrivale; **Lord Warrington of Clyffe**; Lord Thankerton; Sir John Wallis	Appeal dismissed	Quebec Court of King's Bench (Appeal Side)
Lady Davis and another v. Lord Shaughnessy and others	[1931] UKPC 99	"The first of these petitions is one to quash leave to appeal to His Majesty in Council given by a Judge of the Court of King’s Bench (Appeal Side), and thereafter to dismiss the appeal. The petition is opposed, and the appellants, in case they are unsuccessful in their opposition, at the same time present a petition to His Majesty in Council for special leave to appeal."	**Viscount Dunedin**; Lord Blanesburgh; Lord Thankerton; Lord Salvesen; Sir John Wallis	Leave to appeal upheld	Quebec Court of King's Bench (Appeal Side)
O. Martineau and Sons, Limited v. The City of Montreal and another	[1931] UKPC 104	"The action out of which this appeal arises was instituted by the appellant Company in the Superior Court, District of Montreal, on the 3rd September, 1927, in order to have declared unconstitutional and inoperative, so far as they affected its own proprietary interests, certain proceedings taken by the City of Montreal for the expropriation of the appellant Company and other contiguous owners from properties of theirs required by the Corporation for the extension of Rosemount Boulevard from Chambord Street to Papineau Street, all within the area of the city.	**Lord Blanesburgh**; Lord Merrivale; Lord Warrington of Clyffe; Lord Tomlin; Lord Thankerton	Appeal dismissed	Quebec Court of King's Bench (Appeal Side)
S.S. "Leopold L.D." v. The Hochelaga Steamship Company, Limited	[1931] UKPC 111	"The litigation between the parties ensued upon a collision between the appellant’s steel screw steamship, the 'Leopold L.D.,' hereinafter called the 'Leopold,' and the defendants' steel screw steamship, the 'Hochelaga,' in a narrow channel in the river St. Lawrence, below Quebec, in clear weather, at about 2.42 a.m. on November 17th, 1926. The 'Leopold' is a vessel of 5,140 tons gross tonnage, 400 feet in length. She was outward bound with a cargo of grain for Naples. The 'Hochelaga's' gross tonnage is 4,681 and her length 375 feet, and she was bound up river, laden with coal. The casualty occurred in fine, clear weather; the wind was a south-westerly breeze, 'force 5,' and the tide the last of the flood.	Present at the Hearing: Viscount Dunedin; Lord Blanesburgh; **Lord Merrivale**; Nautical Assessors: Captain A.R.H. Morrell; Captain W.R. Chaplin	Appeal dismissed	Supreme Court of Canada
The Municipal Corporation of the City of East Windsor v. The Municipal Corporation of the County of Essex	[1931] UKPC 119	"Prior to the 1st June, 1929, the Town of Ford City formed part of the County of Essex for municipal purposes. By order of the Ontario Railway and Municipal Board dated the 5th March, 1929, Ford City was erected into and incorporated as a City under the name of East Windsor, and it was provided that the order should take effect on the 1st June, 1929."	Viscount Dunedin; Lord Merrivale; **Lord Thankerton**; Lord Russell of Killowen; Sir Lancelot Sanderson	Appeal allowed in part	Ontario Supreme Court (Appellate Division)
The Regent Taxi and Transport Company, Limited v. La Congregation des Petits Frères de Marie dit Frères Maristes	[1932] UKPC 4	"This appeal, brought by special leave from a judgment of the Supreme Court of Canada, involves two important questions arising under the Civil Code of the Province of Quebec, upon one of which an acute division of judicial opinion was disclosed in the Supreme Court." "The respondents are a religious community, incorporated by a Quebec statute, and bound by rules to maintain in sickness and in health its members who, by their vows, own no property, everything acquired by them vesting in the community. One of the members was Brother Henri-Gabriel who was mainly engaged in the writing of textbooks and the teaching of boys."	Viscount Dunedin; Lord Blanesburgh; Lord Atkin; **Lord Russell of Killowen**; Sir George Lowndes	Appeal allowed	Supreme Court of Canada
John Farquhar Lymburn and another v. Albert Henry Mayland and others	[1932] UKPC 5	"This is an appeal from the Supreme Court of Alberta in proceedings taken by the plaintiffs to challenge powers sought to be exercised by the Attorney-General of Alberta under the provisions of the Security Frauds Prevention Act, 1930 (Alberta), Statutes of Alberta 20 G.V. c. 8. Under the terms of Section 9 of that Act the Attorney-General or any delegate appointed by him has power to examine any person or company at any time in order to ascertain whether any fraudulent act as defined by the statute or any offence against the Act or the regulations has been, is being, or is about to be, committed."	Viscount Dunedin; Lord Blanesburgh; **Lord Atkin**; Lord Russell of Killowen; Sir George Lowndes	Appeal allowed	Alberta Supreme Court (Appellate Division)
In the Matter of Silver Brothers, Limited, in Bankruptcy — The Attorney-General of Quebec v. The Attorney-General of Canada	[1932] UKPC 6	"On the 31st day of December, 1923, an order of the Superior Court of the Province of Quebec was made, declaring Messrs. Silver Brothers, Limited, bankrupt." "The Government of the Dominion of Canada duly filed with the trustee in bankruptcy a claim in the sum of $3,707.07 for sales tax imposed in virtue of the Special War Revenue Act, 1915 ..." "The Government of the Province of Quebec also duly filed with the trustee a claim in the sum of $527.42 ..."	**Viscount Dunedin**; Lord Blanesburgh; Lord Merrivale; Lord Russell of Killowen; Sir Lancelot Sanderson	Appeal allowed	Supreme Court of Canada
In re the Jurisdiction of Parliament to Regulate and Control Radio Communication — The Attorney-General of Quebec v. The Attorney-General of Canada and others	[1932] UKPC 7	"This is an appeal from a judgment of the Supreme Court of Canada, answering questions referred to it by His Excellency the Governor-General in Council, for hearing and consideration, pursuant to the authority of Section 55 of the Supreme Court Act (Revised Statutes of Canada 1927, Chapter 35), touching the jurisdiction of the Parliament of Canada to regulate and control radio communication."	**Viscount Dunedin**; Lord Blanesburgh; Lord Merrivale; Lord Russell of Killowen; Sir George Lowndes	Appeal dismissed	Supreme Court of Canada
The Montreal Light, Heat and Power Consolidated and others v. the City of Outremont	[1932] UKPC 14	"The question under consideration in this appeal is whether the appellants or either of them are or is liable to the respondent City of Ontremont for municipal and school taxes in respect of gas mains lying under the public streets of the city."	**Lord Tomlin**; Lord Thankerton; Lord Macmillan	Appeal dismissed	Quebec Court of King's Bench (Appeal Side)
The King v. The B.C. Fir and Cedar Lumber Company, Limited	[1932] UKPC 20	"The broad question for decision is whether certain moneys received by the respondents under use and occupancy policies insuring them against loss of profit resulting from the cessation of business consequential upon fire are liable, under the British Columbia Taxation Act, 1924, to be brought into account by them for assessment to Income Tax."	Viscount Dunedin; **Lord Blanesburgh**; Lord Merrivale; Lord Russell of Killowen; Sir Lancelot Sanderson	Appeal allowed	Supreme Court of Canada
The Winnipeg Electric Company v. Jacob Geel	[1932] UKPC 53	"In this case the respondent who was plaintiff in the action was awarded by a jury the sum of $11,158.25 as damages for personal injuries sustained by him by reason of the negligence of the appellants, who were owners of the motor omnibus which caused the injuries."	Lord Tomlin; Lord Thankerton; Lord Macmillan; Lord Wright; **Sir George Lowndes**	Appeal dismissed	Supreme Court of Canada
E.R. Croft v. Sylvester Dunphy	[1932] UKPC 55	"On the 10th June, 1929, the schooner 'Dorothy M. Smart' sailed for 'the high seas' from the French island of St. Pierre with a cargo on board of rum and other liquors, which are dutiable under Canadian law. The vessel was registered in Nova Scotia and with her cargo was the property of the respondent, who is resident in Nova Scotia."	Lord Tomlin; Lord Thankerton; **Lord Macmillan**; Lord Wright; Sir George Lowndes	Appeal allowed	Supreme Court of Canada
The Corporation of the City of Montreal v. The Montreal Industrial Land Company, Limited	[1932] UKPC 56	"In this appeal the appellants, the City of Montreal, were defendants in the action and were resisting a claim by the respondents, the plaintiff company, that the Court should set aside an assessment made on them in respect of the cost of certain works of paving executed by the appellants on a road or street called Sherbrooke Street, the respondents being frontagers or bordering owners."	Lord Tomlin; Lord Thankerton; Lord Macmillan; **Lord Wright**; Sir George Lowndes	Appeal allowed	Supreme Court of Canada
Paul Pronek v. The Winnipeg, Selkrik and Lake Winnipeg Railway Company	[1932] UKPC 61	"The appellant in this case was plaintiff in the action. He is a farmer living at Rossdale, about 15 miles north of the City of Winnipeg, in the Province of Manitoba, and his claim is that he suffered damage by the respondents' negligence and breach of duty."	Lord Tomlin; Lord Thankerton; Lord Macmillan; **Lord Wright**; Sir George Lowndes	Appeal allowed	Supreme Court of Canada
J.P. Steedman v. Frigidaire Corporation	[1932] UKPC 64	"The appellant was, in 1928, the owner in possession of the premises known as the East End Market in the City of Hamilton. He proposed to equip stalls in the market with refrigerating plant, with a view to letting them to tenants. With that object the appellant communicated through one Lord, then an assistant in his employment, with the respondents who manufacture and deal in refrigerators, as well as various accessory fittings. The respondents are a subsidiary of the General Motors Corporation, and according to the evidence their practice in disposing of their goods on the instalment system is in each case to enter into a contract for purposes of finance with another subsidiary of the General Motors Corporation, called the General Motors Acceptance Corporation, hereinafter referred to as G.M.A.C."	Lord Tomlin; Lord Thankerton; **Lord Macmillan**; Lord Wright; Sir George Lowndes	Appeal allowed	Ontario Supreme Court (Appellate Division)
Florence A. Deeks v. H. G. Wells and others	[1932] UKPC 66	"The action is brought by the plaintiff, Miss Florence Deeks, for breach of copyright, but in substance the action is for breach of confidence in permitting the plaintiff's unpublished manuscript to be used without the plaintiff's consent. The action is brought against the Macmillan Company of Canada, which is the company to which the plaintiff entrusted her manuscript, it is brought against Mr. H. G. Wells, who is said to have used the manuscript of the plaintiff improperly as the foundation of his book, "The Outline of History," and it is brought against the Macmillan Company, Incorporated, of New York, Messrs. George Newnes, Limited, and Messrs. Cassell & Company, Limited, for having published the work of Mr. Wells which had been so composed."	**Lord Atkin**; Lord Tomlin; Lord Thankerton	Appeal dismissed	Ontario Supreme Court (Appellate Division)
Alice Maria Vandepitte v. The Preferred Accident Insurance Company of New York	[1932] UKPC 68	"The appellant, Alice Marie Vandepitte, sustained injuries on the 5th March, 1928, owing to the motor-car, in which she was a passenger and which her husband was driving, being involved in a collision with a motor-car driven by Jean Berry. Jean Berry was the daughter of R.E. Berry and was driving the car which was her father’s property, with his permission."	Lord Tomlin; Lord Thankerton; Lord Macmillan; **Lord Wright**; Sir George Lowndes	Appeal dismissed	Supreme Court of Canada
Lower Mainland Dairy Products Sales Adjustment Committee v. Crystal Dairy, Limited	[1932] UKPC 70	"This appeal arises out of an action by the appellants for a mandamus commanding the respondents, as a distributor as defined by Section 2 of the Dairy Products Sales Adjustment Act, being Chapter 20 of the Statutes of British Columbia, 1929, as amended by the Statutes, 1930, Chapter 13, and 1931, Chapter 14 (hereinafter called 'the Act of 1929'), to make forthwith to the appellants, an incorporated Committee appointed under the Act of 1929, returns of all milk or manufactured products purchased or received by the respondents from dairy farmers as defined by the Act and for damages."	Lord Tomlin; **Lord Thankerton**; Lord Macmillan; Lord Wright; Sir George Lowndes	Appeal dismissed	British Columbia Court of Appeal
Lady Davis and another v. The Right Honourable Lord Shaughnessy and others	[1932] UKPC 80	"Lady Davis, the first appellant in this case, is the widow of Sir Mortimer Barnet Davis, the testator in the cause. He died at Golfe-les-Pins, near Cannes, on the 22nd of March 1928. He had been mainly resident in France for some years before his death, but he retained his domicile in the Province of Quebec, where, a prominent citizen of Montreal, he had spent the greater part of his business life. Lady Davis was his second wife. There was no issue of their marriage. Mr. Mortimer Barnet Davis, the second appellant, who attained the age of 30 towards the end of 1930, is the testator’s only surviving son by a first marriage. No other issue of his survived him."	**Lord Blanesburgh**; Lord Russell of Killowen; Sir George Lowndes	Appeal dismissed	Quebec Court of King's Bench (Appeal Side)
The Ottawa Electric Railway Company v. The Canadian National Railways	[1933] UKPC 33	"This is an appeal by special leave by the Ottawa Electric Railway Company from a judgment of the Supreme Court of Canada, dated the 18th May, 1931, which dismissed an appeal from an order of the Board of Railway Commissioners of Canada dated the 5th of March, 1928, and numbered 40417."	Viscount Sankey, Lord Chancellor; Lord Blanesburgh; Lord Merrivale; Lord Alness; **Sir Lancelot Sanderson**	Appeal dismissed	Supreme Court of Canada
Consolidated Distilleries, Limited, and another v. The King	[1933] UKPC 34	"These are three appeals (consolidated into one) from the three judgments of the Supreme Court of Canada affirming the judgments of the Exchequer Court of Canada delivered in three actions which had been brought by the Crown for the purpose of recovering moneys alleged to be due under certain bonds executed by the appellants in favour of the Crown in the circumstances hereinafter mentioned."	Lord Atkin; Lord Tomlin; Lord Thankerton; **Lord Russell of Killowen**; Lord Macmillan	Appeal allowed	Supreme Court of Canada
John B. Holden v. The Minister of National Revenue	[1933] UKPC 36	"The appellant, who is, and at all material times has been, resident in Canada is the sole surviving executor and trustee of the will of Duncan McMartin, who died on the 2nd May, 1914 domiciled in the Province of Quebec."	Lord Atkin; **Lord Tomlin**; Lord Thankerton; Lord Russell of Killowen; Lord Macmillan	Appeal allowed in part	Supreme Court of Canada
The Dominion Building Corporation, Limited, and another v. The King	[1933] UKPC 42	"This appeal arises out of a reference under Section 38 of the Exchequer Court Act by the acting Minister of Railways and Canals to the Exchequer Court of Canada of a claim by the appellants against the Crown for compensation or damages in respect of the refusal of the Crown acting through the Minister of Railways and Canals to carry out an alleged contract entered into by the appellants or one of them with the Crown for the purchase from the Crown of a property (hereinafter called the Corner property) situate on the corner of King and Yonge Streets in the city of Toronto."	Lord Atkin; **Lord Tomlin**; Lord Thankerton; Lord Russell of Killowen; Lord Macmillan	Appeal allowed	Supreme Court of Canada
The Hydro-Electric Power Commission of Ontario v. The Coniagas Reduction Company, Limited	[1933] UKPC 44	"The action is for a declaration that an agreement made on the 8th November, 1907, between the Falls Power Company, Limited, the predecessors of the appellant, and the Clifton Sand Gravel and Construction Company, the predecessors of the respondent, is a perpetual agreement, at the option of the respondent..."	Lord Atkin; Lord Tomlin; **Lord Thankerton**; Lord Russell of Killowen; Lord Macmillan	Appeal dismissed	Ontario Supreme Court (Appellate Division)
The Bell Telephone Company and others v. The Canadian National Railway and others	[1933] UKPC 45	"In these appeals the validity of four orders made by the Board of Railway Commissioners for Canada is challenged. Appeals Nos. 1, 3 and 5 arise out of an order of the Railway Board, No. 45,410 of the 16th September, 1930, relating to a subway in d'Argenson Street, Montreal; here the appellants are respectively (a) the Bell Telephone Company of Canada; (b) the Montreal Light, Heat and Power Consolidated; and (c) the Montreal Tramways Company and the Montreal Tramways Commission; the respondents are in each case the Canadian National Railways."	Lord Atkin; Lord Tomlin; Lord Thankerton; Lord Russell of Killowen; **Lord Macmillan**	Appeal dismissed	Supreme Court of Canada
The City of Montreal v. The Canadian National Railways	[1933] UKPC 46	"In these appeals the validity of four orders made by the Board of Railway Commissioners for Canada is challenged. ..." "There is in addition before their Lordships a separate appeal in which two of the above-mentioned orders of the Railway Board, Nos. 45,410 and 45,427, relating respectively to the d'Argenson Street subway and the St. Antoine Street subway are also called in question by the City of Montreal, which was granted special leave to appeal by Order in Council of the 10th November, 1932. This separate appeal was called on and argued along with the eight consolidated appeals."	Lord Atkin; Lord Tomlin; Lord Thankerton; Lord Russell of Killowen; **Lord Macmillan**	Appeal dismissed	Board of Railway Commissioners of Canada
The Provincial Treasurer of Alberta and another v. Clara E. Kerr and another	[1933] UKPC 57	"The late Isaac Kendall Kerr died on the 3rd December, 1929, domiciled and resident in the Province of Alberta. He left a large estate, and the respondents in the original appeal, both of whom are resident in the city of Calgary, obtained letters probate as executrix and executor of his will. Thereafter duties amounting to $54,74.21 were assessed under the Alberta Succession Duties Act by the Provincial Treasurer in respect of the property of the deceased, and the respondents, along with a surety, entered into the bond afterwards referred to in order to secure payment of these duties."	Lord Blanesburgh; Lord Atkin; **Lord Thankerton**; Lord Russell of Killowen; Lord Macmillan	Appeal allowed in part	Alberta Supreme Court (Appellate Division)
The Minister of National Revenue v. Mrs. Catherine Spooner	[1933] UKPC 58	The respondent, Mrs. Spooner, in the year 1927 received a sum of $9,570.41 in circumstances set out in an agreed statement of facts. The question is whether this sum was 'income' of the respondent within the meaning of the Income War Tax Act (Revised Statutes of Canada, 1927, ch. 97).	Lord Atkin; Lord Tomlin; **Lord Macmillan**; Lord Wright; Sir George Lowndes	Appeal dismissed	Supreme Court of Canada
Merrill Ring Wilson, Limited, and others v. The Workmen’s Compensation Board	[1933] UKPC 62	"This case comes before their Lordships on appeal from a judgment of the British Columbia Court of Appeal affirming a judgment of the Supreme Court of that Province, which dismissed an action brought by the appellants against The Workmen’s Compensation Board. This Board (hereinafter referred to as the Board) is a body constituted for the administration of Part I of the Workmen’s Compensation Act (R.S. B.C. 1924, chap. 278)."	Lord Blanesburgh; Lord Merrivale; Lord Thankerton; **Lord Russell of Killowen**; Sir Lancelot Sanderson	Appeal dismissed	British Columbia Court of Appeal
The Canadian Northern Pacific Railway Company v. The Kapoor Lumber Company, Limited	[1933] UKPC 63	"In this case an action was brought by the Kapoor Lumber Company, Limited (hereinafter called the Lumber Company), against the Canadian Northern Pacific Railway Company (hereinafter called the Railway Company), in which the Lumber Company claimed to recover a sum of $234,285 as the damage sustained by them to their property through the negligence of the Railway Company in (1) causing or permitting a fire to start upon their right of way at or near the lumber mill owned and operated by the Lumber Company and (2) allowing the fire to get out of control and escape from their right of way and to destroy or damage the property of the Lumber Company."	Lord Blanesburgh; Lord Merrivale; Lord Thankerton; **Lord Russell of Killowen**; Sir Lancelot Sanderson	Appeal allowed	British Columbia Court of Appeal
The Attorney-General of British Columbia v. The Kingcome Navigation Company, Limited	[1933] UKPC 66	"The appellant seeks to recover the tax by virtue of the provisions of the Fuel-oil Tax Act, Statutes of British Columbia, 1930, Chapter 71, ... The issue in the case is whether the legislation in question is ultra vires of the Provincial Legislature in respect either (a) that the taxation imposed thereby is not 'direct taxation' within the terms of section 92(2) of the British North America Act, 1867, or (b) that it invades the exclusive right of the Dominion under section 91(2) to legislate for the regulation of trade and commerce."	Lord Blanesburgh; Lord Atkin; **Lord Thankerton**; Lord Russell of Killowen; Sir George Lowndes	Appeal allowed	British Columbia Court of Appeal
The Mount Royal Assurance Company and others v. The Cameron Lumber Company, Limited	[1933] UKPC 90	"This is an appeal by the defendants from a judgment of the British Columbia Court of Appeal affirming, by a majority, a judgment of the Supreme Court of the same Province whereby, following the verdict of a special jury, the sum of $24,679.07 was adjudged to the plaintiffs. The action in which these judgments were pronounced was one resulting from the consolidation into one action against seven defendant insurance companies of seven suits which had been brought by the plaintiffs against each defendant company separately."	**Lord Blanesburgh**; Lord Merrivale; Lord Thankerton; Lord Russell of Killowen; Sir Lancelot Sanderson	Appeal dismissed	British Columbia Court of Appeal
Clifford B. Reilly v. The King	[1933] UKPC 101	"The suppliant’s case was that, in pursuance of the Pensions Act, he had on August 16th, 1928, been appointed a member of the Federal Appeal Board for a term of five years; that, in breach of contract, he had been dismissed in October, 1930, and he claimed damages."	**Lord Atkin**; Lord Russell of Killowen; Lord Macmillan; Lord Wright; Sir Lancelot Sanderson	Appeal dismissed	Supreme Court of Canada
Isaac William Cannon Solloway v. W.T. Johnson	[1934] UKPC 1	"In the action in the Supreme Court of British Columbia out of which this appeal arises, the defendants were Solloway, Mills & Company, Limited, a large brokerage Dominion company, having its head office in Toronto, with many branches throughout Canada and beyond; Isaac William Cannon Solloway and Harvey Mills, the first the president and the other a director of that company; and Solloway & Mills (B.C.), Limited, an associated Provincial concern."	**Lord Blanesburgh**; Lord Atkin; Lord Thankerton; Lord Russell of Killowen; Sir Lancelot Sanderson	Appeal allowed in part	British Columbia Court of Appeal
The Western Power Company of Canada, Limited v. The Corporation of the District of Matsqui	[1934] UKPC 5	"This appeal is from a portion of a judgment given against the appellant, who was defendant in the Court below, in the Supreme Court of British Columbia and affirmed by the British Columbia Court of Appeal."	Lord Atkin; Lord Russell of Killowen; Lord Macmillan; **Lord Wright**; Sir Lancelot Sanderson	Appeal dismissed	British Columbia Court of Appeal
The Vancouver Malt and Sake Brewing Company, Limited v. The Vancouver Breweries, Limited	[1934] UKPC 9	"The appellants challenge in these proceedings the validity of an agreement in writing which they made with the respondents on the 5th December, 1927. Having been advised that the agreement was not binding upon them, they intimated to the respondents that they proposed to act in disregard of it, whereupon the respondents brought the present action in the Supreme Court of British Columbia claiming a declaration that the agreement was valid and subsisting and enforceable by them against the appellants and an injunction restraining the appellants from acting in contravention of its terms."	Lord Atkin; Lord Russell of Killowen; **Lord Macmillan**; Lord Wright; Sir Lancelot Sanderson	Appeal allowed	British Columbia Court of Appeal
Kenneth de Sola Joseph and another v. Esther Phillips	[1934] UKPC 17	"The appeal raises a short question on the construction of the will of the testator, Abe Lyons. The will was dated the 16th June, 1928. The testator died on the 26th July, 1930, after an illness which began early in June. On the 8th June, 1930, he was moved to hospital, where he remained until his death. During that time he was mentally incapable of looking after his affairs."	Lord Blanesburgh; **Lord Warrington of Clyffe**; Lord Atkin; Lord Macmillan; Lord Alness	Appeal allowed	Ontario Court of Appeal
H.A. Morine and others v. London Loan Assets, Limited, and others	[1934] UKPC 20	"In this case one Morine appeals from a judgment of the Appellate Division of the Supreme Court of Ontario, which dismissed his appeal from a judgment of Wright, J. The relevant facts out of which the litigation originated may be stated briefly."	Lord Merrivale; Lord Thankerton; **Lord Russell of Killowen**; Lord Wright; Lord Alness	Appeal dismissed	Ontario Supreme Court (Appellate Division)
The United Gas and Fuel Company of Hamilton, Limited and another v. The Dominion Natural Gas Company, Limited	[1934] UKPC 22	"The main question which their Lordships have to consider in this appeal concerns the effect of the transfer of certain areas in the Province of Ontario from one local government jurisdiction to another upon the rights and powers of a public utility company operating in the areas transferred. Questions relating to the scope and validity of the company’s rights and power are also raised."	The Lord Chancellor; Lord Blanesburgh; Lord Warrington of Clyffe; Lord Atkin; **Lord Macmillan**	Appeal dismissed	Ontario Court of Appeal
G.A.P. Brickenden v. The London Loan and Savings Company of Canada and others	[1934] UKPC 25	"This is an appeal from a judgment of the Supreme Court of Canada, dated the 29th March, 1933, which reversed a judgment of the Court of Appeal for Ontario, dated the 1st March 1932, and restored the judgment of the Trial Judge (Raney, J.), dated the 11th October 1930.	Lord Merrivale; **Lord Thankerton**; Lord Russell of Killowen; Lord Wright; Lord Alness	Appeal dismissed	Supreme Court of Canada
The Lightning Fastener Company, Limited v. The Colonial Fastener Company, Limited, and others	[1934] UKPC 29	"This appeal relates to a Canadian Patent Nod. 210,202 and dated the 5th of April, 1921, embodying the invention of one Sundback and owned at all material times by the appellants."	Lord Blanesburgh; **Lord Tomlin**; Lord Wright; Lord Alness; Sir Lancelot Sanderson	Appeal allowed	Supreme Court of Canada
Jean MacKenzie v. The Royal Bank of Canada	[1934] UKPC 31	"This is an appeal from a judgment of the Appellate Division of the Supreme Court of Ontario, reversing a judgment of Mr. Justice McEvoy, who at the trial had given judgment for Mrs. MacKenzie the plaintiff, the present appellant. The action was brought to recover certain shares in Borden Company, Inc., which by an amalgamation represented 187 shares in Ottawa Dairy Co., Ltd."	Lord Blanesburgh; Lord Warrington of Clyffe; **Lord Atkin**; Lord Macmillan; Lord Alness	Appeal allowed	Ontario Supreme Court (Appellate Division)
The Attorney-General of Ontario v. Gordon Perry	[1934] UKPC 32	"The principal question for decision on this appeal is whether property to be held upon trusts for the benefit of his wife and the issue of their marriage, transferred by a husband in pursuance of a covenant contained in marriage articles is, within the meaning of the Succession Duty Act of Ontario a 'gift' so as to be chargeable with succession duty on the death of the husband."	**Lord Blanesburgh**; Lord Atkin; Lord Wright; Lord Alness; Sir Lancelot Sanderson	Appeal dismissed	Ontario Court of Appeal
The Canadian Electrical Association and others v. The Canadian National Railways and others	[1934] UKPC 44	"This is an appeal by special leave from a majority judgment of the Supreme Court affirming the legality of a regulation of the Board of Railway Commissioners of Canada propounded by a majority vote of that Board."	**Lord Blanesburgh**; Lord Warrington of Clyffe; Lord Atkin; Lord Macmillan; Lord Alness	Appeal dismissed	Supreme Court of Canada
Harry Oakes v. Charles S. Frankland	[1934] UKPC 45	"The action was brought by the plaintiff, Mr. Charles Frankland, against the defendant, Mr. Harry Oakes, to recover the sum of 15,000 dollars which was alleged to be due to the plaintiff on the terms of an agreement made on November 9, 1931, in settlement of an action which the plaintiff had brought against the defendant in respect of a certain joint adventure of dealings in land."	**Lord Atkin**; Lord Wright; Lord Tomlin; Sir Lancelot Sanderson; Lord Macmillan	Appeal dismissed	Ontario Court of Appeal
Paterson Steamships, Limited v. Canadian Co-operative Wheat Producers, Limited	[1934] UKPC 56	"The appellants were sued as the owners of the steamship 'Sarniadoc', which on the 29th November, 1929, stranded at Main Duck Island at the eastern end of Lake Ontario and became practically a total loss: the respondents sued as owners of a parcel of wheat and barley, being part cargo of the 'Sarniadoc' when she stranded, and in the action claimed damages in respect of the loss of the grain consequent on the stranding.	Lord Atkin; Lord Tomlin; Lord Macmillan; **Lord Wright**; Sir Lancelot Sanderson	Appeal dismissed	Quebec Court of King's Bench (Appeal Side)
Laura McEwan v. Arthur Cosens and others	[1934] UKPC 57	"This is an appeal by special leave from a judgment of the Supreme Court of Canada, dated the 8th June, 1933, reversing a judgment of the British Columbia Court of Appeal dated the 10th December, 1932."	Lord Blanesburgh; **Lord Thankerton**; Lord Russell of Killowen; Lord Alness; Sir Sidney Rowlatt	Appeal dismissed	Supreme Court of Canada
The Vancouver General Hospital v. Annabelle McDaniel and another	[1934] UKPC 60	"This is an appeal from a judgment of the British Columbia Court of Appeal, dated the 6th June, 1933, affirming, by a majority, the judgment of Fisher J. in the Supreme Court of British Columbia, dated the 13th January, 1933."	Lord Blanesburgh; Lord Thankerton; Lord Russell of Killowen; **Lord Alness**; Sir Sidney Rowlatt	Appeal allowed	British Columbia Court of Appeal
William Francis O’Connor v. Gordon Waldron	[1934] UKPC 69	"The original judgment was given on a motion by the defendant to dismiss the plaintiff’s action for slander on the ground that it was frivolous and vexatious. The question is whether the defendant in uttering the words was protected by the absolute privilege which is given to words spoken by a judge."	**Lord Atkin**; Lord Tomlin; Lord Macmillan; Lord Wright; Sir Lancelot Sanderson	Appeal allowed	Supreme Court of Canada
The Attorney-General of Manitoba and others v. The Attorney-General of Canada	[1935] UKPC 1	"This is an appeal by special leave from a judgment of the Supreme Court of Canada given under a reference from the Governor-General-in-Council."	Lord Blanesburgh; Lord Thankerton; **Lord Wright**; Lord Alness; Sir Lancelot Sanderson	Appeal dismissed	Supreme Court of Canada
Andrew Ferguson v. Helen A. Wallbridge and others	[1935] UKPC 7	"This is an appeal from a judgment of the British Columbia Court of Appeal dismissing the appellant’s appeal from the judgment of the trial Judge, Chief Justice Morrison of the Supreme Court. Both Courts therefore are, in the result, in agreement. But the issue between the parties has been the occasion for great divergence in the reasons adduced by the learned Judges for the conclusions reached by them. Although the learned trial Judge and three of the learned Judges in the Court of Appeal were agreed in thinking that the appellant's action failed, the reasons of each for that conclusion differed from those of the others almost as definitely, as they did from the reasons of Mr. Justice McPhillips, the learned member of the Court of Appeal, who would have decreed the plaintiff's suit. And now, following upon an objection to the competency of the proceedings, taken before the Board by the respondents their Lordships find themselves compelled, without essaying to compose these judicial differences, to deal with and finally to dispose of the appeal, on a ground hitherto not suggested as possible. The result is unfortunate, but, they fear, unavoidable."	**Lord Blanesburgh**; Lord Thankerton; Lord Russell of Killowen; Lord Alness; Sir Sidney Rowlatt	Appeal dismissed	British Columbia Court of Appeal
The Standard Fuel Company of Toronto, Limited v. The Toronto Terminals Railway Company	[1935] UKPC 26	"The respondent (hereinafter referred to as the Railway Company) was empowered to expropriate lands for the construction of a railway viaduct on land reclaimed from Toronto Harbour on Lake Ontario. On the 5th November, 1926, a notice of expropriation was given by the Railway Company to one Boulton as owner, and the appellant (hereinafter referred to as the Fuel Company) as tenant of certain lands near the foot of Church Street, Toronto; the Railway Company offering to pay $160,00.00 to the owner and $40,000.00 to the tenant in full compensation for the lands and all damage caused by the exercise of the power of expropriation. These offers were not accepted, and an arbitration accordingly took place under the provisions of the Railway Act, 1919 (9 & 10 Geo. V. cap. 68)."	Lord Blanesburgh; Lord Thankerton; **Lord Russell of Killowen**	Appeal dismissed	Ontario Court of Appeal
British Coal Corporation v. The King	[1935] UKPC 33	"This is a petition for special leave to appeal from a judgment of the Court of King’s Bench (Appeal Side) of the Province of Quebec, delivered on the 5th October, 1934..." "Before their Lordships proceeded to consider questions appertaining to the merits of the petition, they decided in the first instance to determine a preliminary objection, which was that the petition was incompetent by reason of the provisions of section 17 of the Canadian Statute 23 and 24 Geo. V. c. 53 (an Act to amend the Criminal Code)..."	**Viscount Sankey, Lord Chancellor**; Lord Atkin; Lord Tomlin; Lord Macmillan; Lord Wright	Leave to appeal denied	Quebec Court of King's Bench (Appeal Side)
The Canadian National Railway Company v. The Canadian Pacific Railway Company	[1935] UKPC 38	"The issue in this appeal is expressed in the question of law, upon which the Board of Railway Commissioners for Canada gave the present respondent leave to appeal to the Supreme Court of Canada from an order of the Board dated the 12th July 1933 ..."	Lord Blanesburgh; **Lord Thankerton**; Lord Russell of Killowen; Lord Macmillan	Appeal dismissed	Supreme Court of Canada
Raoul Tremblay v. Duke-Price Power Company, Limited	[1935] UKPC 46	"The appeal is brought by the appeallant, who was the owner of land adjacent to, or in the vicinity of, Lake St. John in Quebec. He had a right to compensation for the value of certain land, which the respondents, who are a Hydro-Electric Power Company, had the right to flood, by reason of powers given to them by statute ..."	**Lord Atkin**; Lord Tomlin; Lord Russell of Killowen; Lord Alness; Sir Sidney Rowlatt	Appeal dismissed	Quebec Superior Court
Madame Thomas Potvin and another v. The Gatineau Electric Light Company (Limited)	[1935] UKPC 47	"This is an appeal in forma pauperis from a judgment of the Court of King’s Bench of Quebec confirming the judgment of the trial Judge, which dismissed the plaintiffs’ action." "The action is brought by the widow of the deceased man, Potvin, in respect of injury alleged to have been caused to him which caused his death, arising out of his contact in some way or other with a transformer of the defendant Company, which was on the highway in the place where the deceased man, together with four companions, was proceeding with a view to a holiday."	**Lord Atkin**; Lord Tomlin; Lord Russell of Killowen; Lord Alness; Sir Sidney Rowlatt	Appeal dismissed	Quebec Court of King's Bench (Appeal Side)
The Bell Telephone Company of Canada v. La Ville St. Laurent	[1935] UKPC 52	"The present action was brought by the respondent on the 29th October, 1929, for the recovery of municipal and school taxes imposed upon the immoveables of the appellant situated within the municipality of the respondent for the years 1926, 1927 and 1928."	Lord Atkin; Lord Tomlin; **Lord Thankerton**; Lord Russell of Killowen; Lord Alness	Appeal allowed	Quebec Court of King's Bench (Appeal Side)
The Steamer Phillip T. Dodge v. Dominion Bridge Company, Limited and others	[1935] UKPC 55	"The respondents are the builders and owners of a bridge across the York River at Gaspe in the Province of Quebec. The claim in the action is based upon the allegation that the defendant vessel when passing under the bridge collided with it and carried away one of the bascules owing to the negligent navigation of those on board."	Present at the Hearing: **Lord Atkin**; Lord Tomlin; Lord Russell of Killowen; Lord Alness; Sir Sidney Rowlatt; Nautical Assessors: Captain H.C. Birnie, D.S.O., R.D. Captain W.E. Crumplin	Appeal dismissed	Exchequer Court of Canada
Northwestern Utilities, Limited v. London Guarantee and Accident Company, Limited, and others	[1935] UKPC 63	"The action out of which this appeal arises, was brought by the respondents as respectively owners of property in the City of Edmonton in Alberta and their insurers; they claimed that the property has been destroyed or damaged by a fire due to an escape of gas from the gas main of the appellants for which the appellants are liable."	Viscount Hailsham, Lord Chancellor; Lord Blanesburgh; **Lord Wright**	Appeal dismissed	Alberta Supreme Court (Appellate Division)
The City of Winnipeg and others v. Winnipeg Electric Company	[1935] UKPC 69	"In this appeal presented by the adjoining Cities of Winnipeg and St. Boniface in the Province of Manitoba, their Lordships have been engaged in investigating the validity or otherwise of an order made on the 31st July, 1931, by the Municipal and Public Utility Board of Province."	**Lord Blanesburgh**; Lord Macmillan; Lord Wright	Appeal dismissed	Supreme Court of Canada
The Montreal Trust Company v. The British Columbia Land and Investment Agency, Limited	[1935] UKPC 76	"In the months of January and February, 1926, one T.R. Nickson, who resided in the City of Vancouver, found himself in a position of considerable difficulty. He controlled and managed two companies, the Prudential Holdings, Limited and Nickson Construction Company, Limited, in which he was practically the sole shareholder, and he was being pressed by the Royal Bank of Canada to discharge the sum of $15,500 which was owed by the Construction Company to the bank."	Lord Alness; **Lord Maugham**; Lord Roche	Appeal allowed	British Columbia Court of Appeal
Cora Lillian McPerson v. Oran Leo McPherson	[1935] UKPC 88	"Questions of wide general importance – of interest in some of their aspects to the whole Dominion and even beyond – are raised by this appeal from the Supreme Court of the Province of Alberta. The questions discussed in the judgments appealed from are concerned with the degree of publicity called for at the trial of divorce suits – in particular undefended divorce suits in the Province : their Lordships, however, will have to deal, in addition, with the effect upon a decree nisi made at such a trial and upon a decree absolute following thereon when it is shown – as in this case alleged, that the proceedings at the trial were devoid of sufficient publicity – were, in short, not held in 'Open Court'."	Lord Alness; Lord Maugham; Lord Roche	Appeal dismissed	Alberta Supreme Court (Appellate Division)
Imperial Bank of Canada v. Mary Victoria	[1936] UKPC 30	"This is an appeal by special leave from a judgment of the Supreme Court of Canada dated 21st December, 1934, reversing a judgment of the Appellate Division of the Supreme Court of Alberta dated 24th March, 1934, which allowed an appeal from the judgment of Mr. Justice Boyle the trial Judge. It may be mentioned here that there was a jury at the trial until the close of the evidence; but counsel for both parties agreed that the jury should be dispensed with and the decision of the case was left to the trial Judge who gave judgment in favour of the respondent for the full amount of her claim, viz. : for $13,356 with costs.	Viscount Hailsham, Lord Chancellor; Lord Thankerton; **Lord Maugham**; Sir George Lowndes; Sir Sidney Rowlatt	Appeal dismissed	Supreme Court of Canada
George Pardew Lovibond v. Grand Trunk Railway Company of Canada and others	[1936] UKPC 35	"These are two appeals by special leave. By his first appeal George Pardew Lovibond seeks to reverse an order (dated the 28th June, 1933) of the Court of Appeal of Ontario which dismissed his appeal from the judgment of Kerwin J. pronounced on the 24th February, 1933, in an action in which he was the plaintiff."	Lord Atkin; Lord Thankerton; **Lord Russell of Killowen**; Lord Maugham; Sir George Rankin	Appeal allowed	Ontario Court of Appeal
Hugh Crawford Magee v. Charles W. Magee and others	[1936] UKPC 57	"This is an appeal from a judgment of the British Columbia Court of Appeal which declared the true intent and meaning of the will of one Hugh Magee, who died on the 9th March, 1909."	Lord Atkin; **Lord Russell of Killowen**; Lord Macmillan; Sir Lyman Poore Duff, C.J.C. Sir Michael Myers, C.J.N.Z.	Appeal dismissed	British Columbia Court of Appeal
Enid Browne v. Florence Yoda Moody and others	[1936] UKPC 58	"In this appeal their Lordships have to determine the interpretation and effect of certain provisions in the will of the late Mrs. Katherine Hamilton Browne of Toronto. The testatrix died on 17th March, 1930. She was survived by a son, William George Hamilton Browne, and three daughters, Mrs. Florence Moody, Mrs. Constance Kinnear and Mrs. Helen Smith; she was also survived by a grand-daughter, Enid Browne, the daughter of her son, William George Hamilton Browne.	Lord Atkin; Lord Russell of Killowen; **Lord Macmillan**; Lord Alness; Sir Michael Myers, C.J.N.Z.	Appeal allowed	Supreme Court of Canada
Freeman T. Cross v. Gatineau Power Company	[1936] UKPC 62	"This is an appeal from two judgments of the Court of King’s Bench for the Province of Quebec dated 28th December, 1934, reducing the amount of compensation awarded to the appellant in an action which was heard by Mr. Justice de Lorimier in the Superior Court and in which he pronounced judgment on 28th June, 1933."	Lord Blanesburgh; Lord Maugham; **Lord Roche**	Appeal allowed	Quebec Court of King's Bench (Appeal Side)
Vernon Lloyd-Owen v. Alfred E. Bull and others	[1936] UKPC 63	"This is an appeal by special leave from a judgment of the British Columbia Court of Appeal dated the 17th July, 1935, affirming an order of the Supreme Court dated the 28th March, 1935. The petition on which the order of the Supreme Court was made was presented on the 13th March, 1935, by the appellant and the respondent John S. Salter as liquidator in the voluntary liquidation of a British Columbian company, Pioneer Gold Mines, Limited — to be referred to throughout as "the Company".	**Lord Blanesburgh**; Lord Thankerton; Lord Roche	Appeal allowed	British Columbia Court of Appeal
John A. Allen and others v. F. O’Hearn and Company	[1936] UKPC 76	"This is an appeal from the Court of Appeal of Ontario, who reversed a decision of Kingstone J. in favour of the plaintiffs and dismissed the action with costs. The original plaintiffs were L.S. Clarke and J.A. Allen his trustee in bankruptcy. During the proceedings Mr. Clarke died and his executors were added as parties. The defendants are brokers in Toronto and have a seat on the Standard Stock and Mining Exchange in Toronto and upon other exchanges."	**Lord Atkin**; Lord Russell of Killowen; Lord Macmillan; Lord Alness; Sir Lyman Poore Duff, C.J.C.	Appeal dismissed	Ontario Court of Appeal
James Forbes v. The Attorney-General of Manitoba	[1936] UKPC 88	"The Attorney-General of the Province of Manitoba, suing on behalf of His Majesty in right of the Province, seeks in these proceedings to obtain judgment against the appellant for a sum of $20.80, being tax alleged to be due by him under the Special Income Tax Act, 1933, of the Province of Manitoba."	Lord Atkin; Lord Thankerton; Lord Russell of Killowen; **Lord Macmillan**; Lord Maugham	Appeal dismissed	Supreme Court of Canada
In the matter of a Reference as to whether The Weekly Rest in Industrial Undertakings Act; The Minimum Wages Act and The Limitation of Hours of Work Act of the Statutes of Canada, 1935, are ultra vires of the Parliament of Canada — The Attorney-General of Canada v. The Attorney-General of Ontario and others	[1937] UKPC 6	"This is one of a series of cases brought before this Board on appeal from the Supreme Court of Canada on references by the Governor-General in Council to determine the validity of certain statutes of Canada passed in 1934 and 1935. Their Lordships will deal with all the appeals in due course, but they propose to begin with that involving The Weekly Rest in Industrial Undertakings Act, The Minimum Wages Act and The Limitation of Hours of Work Act, both because of the exceptional importance of the issues involved, and because it affords them an opportunity of stating their opinion upon some matters which also arise in the other cases."	**Lord Atkin**; Lord Thankerton; Lord Macmillan; Lord Wright; Sir Sidney Rowlatt	Appeal dismissed	Supreme Court of Canada
In the matter of a Reference as to whether the Parliament of Canada had legislative jurisdiction to enact the Employment and Social Insurance Act of the Statutes of Canada, 1935 — The Attorney-General of Canada v. The Attorney-General of Ontario and others	[1937] UKPC 7	"This is an appeal from the judgment of the Supreme Court, delivered on 17th June, 1936, in the matter of a reference by the Governor-General in Council dated 5th November, 1935, asking whether the Employment and Social Insurance Act, 1935, was ultra vires of the Parliament of Canada. The majority of the Supreme Court, Rinfret, Cannon, Crocket and Kerwin JJ. answered the question in the affirmative, the Chief Justice and Davis J. dissenting. The Act in its preamble recited Article 23 of the Treaty of Peace, by which in the Covenant of the League of Nations the members of the League agreed that they would endeavour to maintain fair and humane conditions of labour (omitting, however, in the recital that this agreement was subject to and in accordance with the provisions of international conventions existing or hereafter to be agreed), and Article 427 of the said treaty, by which it was declared that the well-being, physical, moral and intellectual, of industrial wage earners, was of supreme international importance.	**Lord Atkin**; Lord Thankerton; Lord Macmillan; Lord Wright; Sir Sidney Rowlatt	Appeal dismissed	Supreme Court of Canada
In the matter of a Reference as to whether the Parliament of Canada had legislative jurisdiction to enact Section 498a of The Criminal Code — The Attorney-General of British Columbia v. The Attorney-General of Canada and others	[1937] UKPC 8	"This is an appeal from a judgment of the Supreme Court of Canada delivered on 17th June, 1936, on a reference by the Governor-General in Council dated 5th November, 1935, raising the question whether section 498A of the Criminal Code is ultra vires of the Parliament of Canada.	**Lord Atkin**; Lord Thankerton; Lord Macmillan; Lord Wright; Sir Sidney Rowlatt	Appeal dismissed	Supreme Court of Canada
The Attorney-General of British Columbia v. the Attorney-General of Canada and others	[1937] UKPC 9	"This is an appeal from the Supreme Court on a reference by the Governor-General in Council dated 5th November, 1935, raising the question whether the Natural Products Marketing Act, 1934, as amended by the Natural Products Marketing Act Amendment Act, 1935, is ultra vires of the Parliament of Canada. The Supreme Court unanimously answered the question in the affirmative."	**Lord Atkin**; Lord Thankerton; Lord Macmillan; Lord Wright; Sir Sidney Rowlatt	Appeal dismissed	Supreme Court of Canada
In the matter of a Reference as to whether the Parliament of Canada had legislative jurisdiction to enact The Farmers’ Creditors Arrangement Act, 1934 — The Attorney-General of British Columbia v. The Attorney-General of Canada and others	[1937] UKPC 10	This appeal by special leave challenges the constitutional validity of the Farmers’ Creditors Arrangement Act, 1934, which was enacted by the Dominion Parliament as chapter 53 of the Statutes of Canada, 1934.	Lord Atkin; **Lord Thankerton**; Lord Macmillan; Lord Wright; Sir Sidney Rowlatt	Appeal dismissed	Supreme Court of Canada
In the matter of a Reference as to whether the Parliament of Canada had legislative jurisdiction to enact The Dominion Trade and Industry Commission Act, 1935 — The Attorney-General of Ontario v. The Attorney General of Canada and others	[1937] UKPC 11	"This is an appeal and cross-appeal from a judgment of the Supreme Court on a reference by the Governor-General in Council dated 5th November, 1935, asking whether The Dominion Trade and Industry Commission Act was ultra vires of the Parliament of Canada."	**Lord Atkin**; Lord Thankerton; Lord Macmillan; Lord Wright; Sir Sidney Rowlatt	Appeal allowed in part	Supreme Court of Canada
Maritime Electric Company, Limited v. General Dairies, Limited]	[1937] UKPC 16	"This is an appeal by special leave from a judgment of the Supreme Court of Canada dated the 28th June, 1935, reversing a judgment of the Appeal Division of the Supreme Court of New Brunswick. That Court had affirmed a judgment in the King’s Bench Division whereby the appellants had recovered against the respondents the sum of $1,931.82 and costs.	Lord Atkin; Lord Thankerton; Lord Russell of Killowen; Lord Alness; **Lord Maugham**	Appeal allowed	Supreme Court of Canada
The Judges v. The Attorney-General for the Province of Saskatchewan	[1937] UKPC 31	"This is an appeal from a judgment of the Court of Appeal for Saskatchewan dated the 6th June, 1936, answering in the affirmative certain questions referred to the Court by the Lieutenant-Governor in Council for hearing and consideration pursuant to the Constitutional Questions Act, Chapter 60 of the Revised Statutes of Saskatchewan, 1930.	Lord Blanesburgh; Lord Atkin; Lord Maugham; Lord Roche; **Sir Sidney Rowlatt**	Appeal dismissed	Saskatchewan Court of Appeal
Georgina Laverdure v. Hon. Pamphile R. Du Tremblay and others	[1937] UKPC 35	By that judgment Mr. Justice Duclos had maintained an action in which the appellant, Georgiana Laverdure, the widow, testamentary executrix, and universal legatee of Edouard Berthiaume who died on the 24th December, 1933, claimed from the respondents, trustees under a deed of gift executed by the late Hon. Trefflé Berthiaume (to be called for convenience "the donor"), and also from the respondent Du Tremblay, as sole trustee under the will of the donor, certain dividends declared by the respondents, La Presse Publishing Company, Limited (to be called "the Company") on its preferred and common stocks on the 27th December, that is to say three days after the death of Edouard Berthiaume, payable on the 2nd January following.	Lord Blanesburgh; Lord Atkin; **Lord Maugham**; Lord Roche; Sir Sidney Rowlatt	Appeal allowed	Quebec Court of King's Bench (Appeal Side)
St. Francis Hydro Electric Company, Limited, and others v. The King and others	[1937] UKPC 37	"The appellants succeeded in maintaining their title to certain riparian lands on the St. Francis River at a point called Spicer Rapids, some 25 miles up the river from Lake St. Peter through which the St. Lawrence flows."	Lord Blanesburgh; Lord Atkin; **Lord Maugham**; Lord Roche; Sir Sidney Rowlatt	Appeal dismissed	Quebec Court of King's Bench (Appeal Side)
William I. Bishop, Limited, and Others v. The James Mclaren Company, Limited	[1937] UKPC 43	"This is an appeal from two judgments of the Court of King’s Bench for the Province of Quebec (Appeal Side) dated 27th December, 1935, reducing by the first judgment the amount awarded to the appellants by the Superior Court for the District of Montcalm from $293,584.84 with interest on $87,444.68 from the date of the institution of the action (4th December, 1930) and with interest on the balance ($206,066.16) from the date of the judgment of the Superior Court (10th June, 1934) to $1,429.60 with interest therein from the date of the institution of the action.	Lord Blanesburgh; Lord Atkin; Lord Thankerton; Lord Maugham; **Lord Roche**	Appeal allowed	Quebec Court of King's Bench (Appeal Side)
Captain W. F. Wake-Walker, O.B.E., R.N. v. Steamer Colin W., Limited, and others	[1937] UKPC 49	In the early morning of the 13th of August, 1934, H.M.S. "Dragon" with a pilot on board was proceeding up the St. Lawrence inbound from Quebec. The "Dragon" is a twin screw cruiser, 470 feet long, 41 feet in beam, and was drawing about 16 ½ feet. Her shaft horse-power is about 40,000 and her cruising speed is 12 knots (105 to 107 revolutions) and her full speed is 27 knots. She intended to berth at the cross-wall at the inner end of the Market Basin, Montreal, which is situated on the north side of the river, and she had received a letter from the Harbour authorities stating that the berth would be ready for her at 9 o’clock, with a tug in attendance to berth her, if required.	Present at the Hearing: **Viscount Sankey**; Lord Blanesburgh; Lord Merrivale; Lord Atkin; Lord Macmillan Nautical Assessors: Captain Mackay; Captain W.R. Chaplin	Appeal dismissed	Supreme Court of Canada
International Railway Company v. The Niagara Parks Commission	[1937] UKPC 50	"The main question to be determined in this appeal relates to the basis on which the appellants are entitled to be compensated on the transfer to the respondents of an electric railway constructed by the appellants on the Canadian bank of the Niagara River."	Viscount Sankey; Lord Blanesburgh; **Lord Macmillan**	Appeal allowed in part	Ontario Court of Appeal
Robin Hood Mills Limited v. Paterson Steamships Limited	[1937] UKPC 54	"This is an appeal by the defendants from a judgment of the Exchequer Court of Canada dated 17th July, 1935, dismissing their appeal from a judgment of the Hon. Mr. Justice Demers sitting as the Local Judge in Admiralty for the District of Quebec dated 15th December, 1934, whereby the respondents obtained a decree for limitation of liability under the Merchant Shipping Act, 1894."	Lord Atkin; Lord Thankerton; **Lord Roche**	Appeal dismissed	Exchequer Court of Canada
E.B.M. Company, Limited v. The Dominion Bank	[1937] UKPC 68	"In this case E.B.M. Company, Limited (a company incorporated by Dominion Letters Patent dated the 8th May, 1922, and granted under the Dominion Companies Act) appeals from a judgment and order of the Court of Appeal for Ontario which affirmed a judgment or order of Kelly J. in favour of the respondents, the Dominion Bank."	Lord Blanesburgh; **Lord Russell of Killowen**; Lord Macmillan	Appeal allowed	Ontario Court of Appeal
A. Vivian Mansell v. The Star Printing and Publishing Company of Toronto Limited	[1937] UKPC 82	"The plaintiff in these proceedings (now the appellant) is a publisher of fine art colour prints who resides in England and does business through the world. He complains that between the months of March and July, 1932, the respondents in infringement of his rights published in Toronto, in the illustrated section of a newspaper owned by them and known as the 'Star Weekly', a number of pictures of which he claims to be entitled to the copyright."	Lord Atkin; **Lord Macmillan**; Lord Wright; Lord Alness; Lord Maugham	Appeal dismissed	Ontario Court of Appeal
The King v. Southern Canada Power Company, Limited	[1937] UKPC 83	"This is an appeal by special leave from a judgment of the Supreme Court of Canada dated the 15th January, 1936, reducing the amount of damages awarded by a judgment of the Exchequer Court of Canada, rendered on the 29th December, 1933, in favour of the appellant, from $80,923.20, with interest thereon from the date of the judgment, to $31,418.03. There is a cross-appeal, also by special leave, by which the respondents in the original appeal seek to have the judgment of the Supreme Court reversed and the action dismissed.	Lord Atkin; Lord Macmillan; Lord Wright; Lord Alness; **Lord Maugham**	Appeal allowed	Supreme Court of Canada
Isaac W.C. Solloway and another v. J.P. McLaughlin	[1937] UKPC 88	"These are an appeal and a cross appeal from decisions of the Supreme Court of Canada in an action brought in the High Court of Ontario by the present respondent against two companies named Solloway Mills and Co., Ltd., one registered in Ontario and the other in the Dominion and against the present appellants Mr. Isaac Solloway and Mr. Harvey Mills, two of the directors of the companies."	**Lord Atkin**; Lord Macmillan; Lord Wright; Lord Maugham	Appeal allowed	Supreme Court of Canada
The Knight Sugar Company, Limited v. The Alberta Railway and Irrigation Company	[1937] UKPC 109	"In this appeal from a judgment of the Appellate Division of the Supreme Court of Alberta, which affirmed the dismissal by Ford J. of the appellants’ action, the relevant facts are not in dispute."	Lord Atkin; Lord Thankerton; **Lord Russell of Killowen**; Lord Macmillan; Lord Wright	Appeal dismissed	Alberta Supreme Court (Appellate Division)
The King v. Henri Jalbert and another	[1938] UKPC 3	"This appeal concerns a small plot of foreshore at Chicoutimi on the Saguenay River in the Province of Quebec."	Lord Atkin; Lord Thankerton; Lord Russell of Killowen; **Lord Wright**; Lord Maugham	Appeal dismissed	Supreme Court of Canada
The Corporation of the City of Toronto v. The Corporation of the Township of York	[1938] UKPC 5	"This is an appeal from the Court of Appeal of Ontario dismissing an appeal from an order of the Ontario Municipal Board which ordered the appellants to make discovery of documents and to permit inspection of their waterworks system and ordered the appellants’ Commissioner of Works to be examined on discovery."	**Lord Atkin**; Lord Thankerton; Lord Macmillan; Lord Wright; Lord Maugham	Appeal dismissed	Ontario Court of Appeal
Clifford Sifton and another v. Robert Oliver Sweezey	[1938] UKPC 9	"In this action the appellants, as executors of the late Clifford Winfield Burrows Sifton (hereinafter referred to as Winfield Sifton), seek to recover from the respondent the sum $50,000 with interest of $3,972.61, or $53,972.61 in all, as due in respect of an agreement made between the respondent and Winfield Sifton in 1927."	Lord Atkin; **Lord Thankerton**; Lord Russell of Killowen; Lord Wright; Lord Maugham	Appeal allowed	Quebec Court of King's Bench (Appeal Side)
The Canadian Shredded Wheat Company, Limited v. The Kellogg Company of Canada Limited and another	[1938] UKPC 11	"In this case the Canadian Shredded Wheat Co., Ltd. (hereinafter referred to as the plaintiff) sued two defendants in the Supreme Court of Ontario, claiming an injunction to restrain an alleged infringement of registered trade marks and passing off of goods and damages."	Lord Atkin; Lord Thankerton; **Lord Russell of Killowen**; Lord Wright; Lord Maugham	Appeal dismissed	Ontario Court of Appeal
Elizabeth Arminella Burrows Sifton v. Clifford Sifton and others	[1938] UKPC 41	"This is an appeal from a judgment of the Court of Appeal for the Province of Ontario which varied a judgment of Middleton J. given upon an application by way of originating motion brought by the respondents, Clifford Sifton and Wilfred Victor Sifton, the surviving trustees of the will of Clifford Winfield Burrows Sifton, deceased. By the motion the trustees sought the opinion, advice and direction of the Court on certain questions arising in the administration of that testator’s estate."	Lord Thankerton; **Lord Romer**; Sir Lancelot Sanderson	Appeal allowed	Ontario Court of Appeal
Reference re Alberta Statutes — Attorney General of Alberta v. Attorney General of Canada	[1938] UKPC 46	"This is an appeal by the Attorney-General of Alberta from a judgment of the Supreme Court of Canada (Duff C.J., Cannon, Crocket, Davis, Kerwin and Hudson JJ.) dated 4th March, 1938, on a reference to them by the Governor-General of Canada under section 55 of the Supreme Court Act (Revised Statutes of Canada, 1927, c. 35). The subject of the reference and of this appeal is the power of the Legislature of the Province of Alberta to enact three Bills which had been presented to the Lieutenant-Governor of Alberta for assent on 5th October, 1937, and reserved by him for the signification of the Governor-General’s pleasure."	**Lord Maugham, Lord Chancellor)**; Lord Atkin; Lord Thankerton; Lord Russell of Killowen; Lord Macmillan	Appeal dismissed	Supreme Court of Canada
George Walkem Shannon and others v. Lower Mainland Dairy Products Board and the Attorney General of British Columbia	[1938] UKPC 54	"This is an appeal from a decision of the Court of Appeal for British Columbia reversing a decision of Manson J. who had given judgment in the action in favour of the plaintiffs, the present appellants. The appellants were dairy farmers carrying on their business in the Province of British Columbia and were affected by a Milk Marketing Scheme approved by the Lieutenant-Governor in Council under the Natural Products Marketing (British Columbia) Act, Chapter 34, of the Statutes of 1936."	Lord Maugham, Lord Chancellor; **Lord Atkin**; Lord Thankerton; Lord Russell of Killowen; Lord Macmillan	Appeal dismissed	British Columbia Court of Appeal
Mary Elizabeth Wood and others v. Gerald Allan Wood	[1938] UKPC 56	"Mary G. Wood made her will, dated the 29th November, 1923. By it she bequeathed pecuniary legacies amounting in all to $9,000; she bequeathed three life annuities of $400 each; she made bequests of common capital stock of the Bank of Nova Scotia amounting in all to 125 shares therein; she made a specific bequest of 15 shares in the Canada Cement Company to her niece Helen Carvolth; she made a specific bequest of chattels to her sister Charlotte Edwards, and a specific bequest of her shares in the Ottawa Transportation Company, Limited, to her son Gerald A. Wood; and after specific devises of real estate, her will concluded as follows:— ..."	Lord Atkin; Lord Thankerton; **Lord Russell of Killowen**; Lord Roche; Sir Lyman Poore Duff, C.J.C.	Appeal allowed	Ontario Court of Appeal
Northern Ontario Power Company Limited v. La Roche Mines Limited and another	[1938] UKPC 57	"These consolidated appeals, from the Court of Appeal for Ontario, relate to the liability, if any, of La Roche Mines, Ltd., under a contract with Northern Ontario Power Co., Ltd., for the supply of electric power."	Lord Atkin; Lord Thankerton; **Lord Russell of Killowen**; Lord Macmillan; Sir Lyman Poore Duff, C.J.C.	Appeal allowed	Ontario Court of Appeal
Michael Burns v. Mabel Burns	[1938] UKPC 59	"The appellant, who is plaintiff in the action as administrator of the estate of Dominic Burns, deceased, and in his own right, appeals from a judgment of the Court of Appeal for British Columbia dated the 11th January, 1938, affirming the judgment of Robertson J., dated the 26th May, 1937, which dismissed the appellant's action against the respondent as administratrix of the estate of James Francis Burns, deceased, and in her own right...	Lord Atkin; **Lord Thankerton**; Lord Russell of Killowen; Lord Roche; Sir Lyman Poore Duff, C.J.C.	Appeal dismissed	British Columbia Court of Appeal
Leslie Colbatch Clark v. The Yukon Consolidated Gold Corporation Limited	[1938] UKPC 74	"Their Lordships do not require to hear Counsel for the respondents." "In this appeal Counsel for the appellant asks their Lordships to re-open a concurrent finding of fact by both Courts below that the transaction between Worsdale and Treadgold in the present case was a colourable transaction and not a real transaction."	**Lord Thankerton**; Lord Russell of Killowen; Lord Macmillan; Lord Wright; Lord Romer	Appeal dismissed	Ontario Court of Appeal
Canadian Celanese Limited v. The B.V.D. Company, Limited	[1939] UKPC 3	The appellants are assignees of Canadian letters patent no. 265,960 granted on the 16th November, 1926, to one Camille Dreyfus, concerning an alleged invention of "improvements relating to fabrics and sheet materials and the manufacture thereof." It is not necessary to discuss the specification in detail. It is sufficient to say that it contains 25 claims of which the first 24 are process claims, and the 25th covers the product. The first claim may be taken as a sample of all, for in respect of their excessive breadth (to which reference will later be made) the claims are all identical."	Lord Thankerton; **Lord Russell of Killowen**; Lord Macmillan; Lord Wright; Lord Romer	Appeal dismissed	Supreme Court of Canada
Dame Diana Meredith and other v. Dame Elizabeth Magadalene Meredith and other	[1939] UKPC 4	"This is an appeal from the judgment of the Court of King’s Bench for the Province of Quebec (Appeal Side) affirming a judgment rendered by Chief Justice Greenshields in the Superior Court in favour of the respondents. It should be mentioned that the matter came before the trial judge sitting at Montreal, under the provision of article 509 of the Code of Civil Procedure, upon a joint factum of the appellants and respondents setting out an agreed statement of facts and a question of construction arising therefrom."	**The Lord Chancellor (Lord Maugham)**; Lord Thankerton; Lord Russell of Killowen; Lord Macmillan; Lord Romer	Appeal dismissed	Quebec Court of King's Bench (Appeal Side)
Vita Food Products Inc. v, Unus Shipping Company Limited in liquidation	[1939] UKPC 7	"This appeal arises out of a claim made against the respondent, a body corporate incorporated under the law of Nova Scotia now in liquidation, as owner of the motor vessel "Hurry On" registered at the port of Halifax, Nova Scotia. The claim was made by the appellant, a body corporate carrying on business at New York, in the United States, for damages and loss suffered in respect of consignments of herrings which were being carried in the "Hurry On" from Middle Arm, Newfoundland, to New York, and were delivered in a damaged condition."	Lord Atkin; Lord Russell of Killowen; Lord Macmillan; **Lord Wright**; Lord Porter	Appeal dismissed	Nova Scotia Supreme Court en Banc
Edgar F. Ladore and others v. George Bennett and others	[1939] UKPC 33	"The plaintiffs’ claim was for a declaration that two statutes of Ontario providing for the amalgamation of certain municipalities in Ontario were ultra vires the legislature of Ontario, and that the corporations created in pursuance of those statutes were not valid or subsisting and a declaration that parts of other Ontario statutes, viz., the Ontario Municipal Board Act, 1932, and the Department of Municipal Affairs Act, 1935, and amendments thereto were also ultra vires. The questions raised in the case arise out of the affairs of four adjoining municipalities, the city of Windsor, the city of East Windsor, the town of Sandwich and the town of Walkerville."	**Lord Atkin**; Lord Russell of Killowen; Lord Macmillan; Lord Wright; Lord Romer	Appeal dismissed	Ontario Court of Appeal
Robert Oliver Sweezy v. Beauharnois Power Corporation Limited	[1939] UKPC 43	"In an action in which the executors of one Winfield Sifton deceased were plaintiffs and the present appellant (hereinafter called the appellant) was defendant, the appellant was by a judgment of the Superior Court of the Province of Quebec (dated the 15th day of January, 1935), adjudged liable to pay to the plaintiffs the sum of $50,000, referred to in the letters hereinafter mentioned. This judgment was reversed by the Court of King’s Bench (Appeal Side), but was restored on appeal to His Majesty in Council by Order in Council of the 24th February, 1938."	Lord Atkin; **Lord Russell of Killowen**; Lord Macmillan; Lord Romer; Sir Sidney Rowlatt	Appeal dismissed	Quebec Court of King's Bench (Appeal Side)
Canada Rice Mills Limited v. The King	[1939] UKPC 56	"This is an appeal from the Supreme Court of Canada who dismissed an appeal from the President of the Exchequer Court on a claim by the Crown for sales tax on transaction by the appellant company."	**Lord Atkin**; Lord Thankerton; Lord Russell of Killowen; Lord Wright; Lord Romer	Appeal dismissed	Supreme Court of Canada
The People of the State of New York v. Heirs of the late John M. Phillips and others	[1939] UKPC 58	"The action arises in unusual circumstances. The plaintiffs are the People of the State of New York and they sue the defendants, the heirs of the late John M. Phillips, for damages for an alleged conspiracy between Phillips, one Connolly and one Seely to cheat and defraud the City of New York over the construction of sewers in the Borough of Queens in the City of New York."	**Lord Atkin**; Lord Thankerton; Lord Russell of Killowen; Lord Wright; Lord Romer	Appeal dismissed	Quebec Court of King's Bench (Appeal Side)
Montreal Trust Company and another v. Canadian National Railway Company	[1939] UKPC 61	"In this case the Montreal Trust Company and one Seguin, appeal from a judgment of the Court of King’s Bench (Appeal Side) of the Province of Quebec, which affirmed a judgment of the Superior Court. The judgment declared a lease by Seguin to the Canadian National Railway Company, to be illegal and void, and dismissed with costs an action for rent thereunder brought by the Montreal Trust Company as transferee of Seguin’s rights under the lease. Seguin was summoned as mis-en-cause."	Lord Atkin; Lord Thankerton; **Lord Russell of Killowen**; Lord Wright; Lord Romer	Appeal dismissed	Quebec Court of King's Bench (Appeal Side)
The Minister of National Revenue v. The Trusts and Guarantee Company Limited	[1939] UKPC 67	"The question to be determined on the appeal is whether the respondents who are a Canadian company are, as the trustees of an indenture of the 27th May, 1918, liable to be assessed to income tax in respect of the income accumulated by them during the years 1919 to 1934 inclusive pursuant to the trust for accumulation contained in that indenture."	Lord Atkin; Lord Thankerton; Lord Russell of Killowen; Lord Wright; **Lord Romer**	Appeal allowed	Supreme Court of Canada
Francis Day & Hunter Limited v. Twentieth Century Fox Corporation Limited and others	[1939] UKPC 68	"In 1892 a song entitled "The Man Who Broke the Bank at Monte Carlo" was published in London. It consisted of three verses, with a chorus and was written and composed by Fred Gilbert. Many people remember the original publication. Both words and music were of the most commonplace character, but the music went with a jaunty swing performed by Charles Coborn. The song consisting of words and music was duly registered at Stationers Hall in London and acquired copyright under the Copyright Act of 1842. But the performing right was not acquired, because of the failure to comply with the conditions imposed by the English Copyright (Musical Compositions) Act, 1882, which required that the proprietor of the copyright if he desired to acquire and retain the right of public representation or performance should print upon the title page of every published copy a notice to the effect that the right of public representation or performance was reserved."	Lord Thankerton; Lord Russell of Killowen; **Lord Wright**; Lord Romer; Sir Lyman Poore Duff, C.J.C.	Appeal dismissed	Ontario Supreme Court (Appellate Division)
Pioneer Laundry & Dry Cleaners Limited v. The Minister of National Revenue	[1939] UKPC 70	"This appeal is taken from a judgment of the Supreme Court of Canada, dated the 12th December, 1938, which affirmed a judgment of the Exchequer Court of Canada, dated the 4th November, 1937, whereby the appellant’s appeal from a decision of the respondent, affirming an assessment of the appellant to income tax for the tax year ending on the 31st March, 1933, was dismissed."	Lord Atkin; **Lord Thankerton**; Lord Russell of Killowen; Lord Wright; Lord Romer	Appeal allowed	Supreme Court of Canada

== Summary by year and result ==
Year	Number of Cases	Appeal Allowed		Appeal Dismissed	
1930	15	6	40.0%	9	60.0%
1931	18	10	55.6%	8	44.4%
1932	15	8	53.3%	7	46.7%
1933	14	6	42.9%	8	57.1%
1934	16	7	43.8%	9	56.2%
1935	13	2	15.4%	11	84.6%
1936	8	4	50.0%	4	50.0%
1937	19	8	42.1%	11	57.9%
1938	11	4	36.4%	7	63.6%
1939	11	2	18.2%	9	81.8%
Total Cases	140	57	40.7%	83	59.3%
Yearly Averages	14	5.7		8.3	

== Summary by jurisdiction and court appealed from ==
Jurisdiction	Number of Cases	On Appeal from Supreme Court of Canada		On Appeal from Other Courts	
Federal	39	35	89.7%	4	10.3%
Ontario	39	4	10.3%	35	89.7%
Quebec	26	6	23.1%	20	76.9%
Nova Scotia	3	2	66.7%	1	33.3%
New Brunswick	1	1	100.0%	0	0.0%
Manitoba	5	4	80.0%	1	20.0%
British Columbia	20	3	15.0%	17	85.0%
Prince Edward Island	0	0	0.0%	0	0.0%
Saskatchewan	1	0	0.0%	1	100.0%
Alberta	6	1	16.7%	5	83.3%
North-West Territories	0	0	0.0%	0	0.0%
Yukon	0	0	0.0%	0	0.0%
Total	140	56	40.0%	84	60.0%

== See also ==
- List of Canadian appeals to the Judicial Committee of the Privy Council, 1867–1869
- List of Canadian appeals to the Judicial Committee of the Privy Council, 1870–1879
- List of Canadian appeals to the Judicial Committee of the Privy Council, 1880–1889
- List of Canadian appeals to the Judicial Committee of the Privy Council, 1890–1899
- List of Canadian appeals to the Judicial Committee of the Privy Council, 1900–1909
- List of Canadian appeals to the Judicial Committee of the Privy Council, 1910–1919
- List of Canadian appeals to the Judicial Committee of the Privy Council, 1920–1929
- List of Canadian appeals to the Judicial Committee of the Privy Council, 1940–1949
- List of Canadian appeals to the Judicial Committee of the Privy Council, 1950–1959

== Sources ==
- British and Irish Legal Information Institute: Privy Council Decisions
- 1931 Privy Council Decisions
- 1932 Privy Council Decisions
- 1933 Privy Council Decisions
- 1934 Privy Council Decisions
- 1935 Privy Council Decisions
- 1936 Privy Council Decisions
- 1937 Privy Council Decisions
- 1938 Privy Council Decisions
- 1939 Privy Council Decisions
