= List of Canadian appeals to the Judicial Committee of the Privy Council, 1940–1949 =

List of Canadian appeals to the JCPC (1940–1949)

This page lists all cases of the Judicial Committee of the Privy Council originating in Canada, and decided in the years 1940 to 1949.

From 1867 to 1949, the JCPC was the highest court of appeal for Canada (and, separately, for Newfoundland). During this period, its decisions on Canadian appeals were binding precedent on all Canadian courts, including the Supreme Court of Canada. Any decisions from this era that the Supreme Court of Canada has not overruled since gaining appellate supremacy in 1949 remain good law, and continue to bind all Canadian courts other than the Supreme Court.

The Parliament of Canada abolished appeals to the JCPC of criminal cases in 1933 and civil cases in 1949. Ongoing cases that had begun before those dates remained appealable to the JCPC. The final JCPC ruling on a Canadian case was rendered in 1959, in Ponoka-Calmar Oils v Wakefield.

== Case list ==
Case name	Citation	Subject (Exact Text from Judgment)	Judges (Author of decision in bold)	Appeal Allowed or Dismissed	On Appeal From
The Board of Trustees of the Lethbridge Irrigation District and another v. The Independent Order of Foresters and the Attorney-General of Canada; The King v. The Independent Order of Foresters and the Attorney-General of Canada	[1940] UKPC 8	These two appeals raise questions of the validity of three Acts of the Legislative Assembly of the Province of Alberta, all passed on the 14th April, 1937. In the first appeal the Provincial Guaranteed Securities Interest Act, Chapter 12 of the Statutes of Alberta, 1937, and the Provincially Guaranteed Securities Proceedings Act, Chapter 11 of the Statutes of Alberta, 1937, in so far as it relates to the subject matter of the proceedings under appeal, have been declared ultra vires by the Appellate Division of the Supreme Court of Alberta dismissing an appeal from a judgment of Mr. Justice Ewing dated the 29th October, 1937."	**Viscount Caldecote, Lord Chancellor**; Viscount Sankey; Viscount Maugham; Lord Roche; Lord Porter	Appeal dismissed	Alberta Supreme Court (Appellate Division)
The Honourable John E. Brownlee v. Vivian MacMillan	[1940] UKPC 36	"The respondent and her father brought an action against the appellant under the Seduction Act, Chapter 102 of the Revised Statutes of Alberta, 1922, in which they severally claimed damages for the seduction of the respondent. The Jury found in favour of both plaintiffs, awarding the respondent 10,000 dollars damages and her father 5,000 dollars. Ives J., the trial Judge, expressed disagreement with the verdict of the Jury, and subsequently, notwithstanding the verdict, gave judgment dismissing the action with costs, on the construction of the statute."	(Viscount Caldecote, Lord Chancellor; Viscount Sankey; **Lord Thankerton**; Lord Russell of Killowen; Lord Roche	Appeal dismissed	Supreme Court of Canada
Canada Rice Mills Limited v. The Union Marine and general Insurance Company Limited	[1940] UKPC 56	"The appellants claimed in this action as assured under a floating policy of marine insurance dated the 19th December, 1929, upon shipments of rice imported by the appellants to their rice mills in British Columbia, as from time to time declared under the policy."	Viscount Maugham; Lord Russell of Killowen; **Lord Wright**; Lord Porter	Appeal allowed	British Columbia Court of Appeal
Connors Bros. Ltd. and others v. Bernard Connors	[1940] UKPC 57	"This is an appeal from a judgment of the Supreme Court of Canada dated the 19th December, 1938, which (by a majority of three Judges to two) reversed the judgment of the Supreme Court of New Brunswick, Appellate Division. The latter had dismissed an appeal from a judgment of the Chief Justice of New Brunswick. The divergence of judicial opinion is striking, since six judges in Canada were in favour of the present appellants and three — the majority in the Supreme Court of Canada — took the other view. These differences have perhaps been accentuated by the curious shape which the proceedings assumed. The main question has throughout been whether certain covenants entered into by Bernard Connors the present respondent with the appellants or any of those covenants are enforceable or whether on the other hand they are unenforceable as being in restraint of trade."	Viscount Simon, Lord Chancellor; **Viscount Maugham**; Lord Russell of Killowen; Lord Wright; Lord Porter	Appeal allowed	Supreme Court of Canada
International Railway Company v. the Niagara Parks Commission	[1941] UKPC 16	"On the 29th August 1938 the International Railway Company (hereinafter called 'the Appellant Company"') instituted an action in the Supreme Court of Ontario against the Niagara Parks Commission (hereinafter called 'the Commission') to recover $227,538.22 representing the unpaid balance of $251,322.08 claimed to be due in respect of interest at 5 per cent per annum from the 1st September 1932 to the 3rd June 1937 on a capital sum of $1,057,4436.00."	Lord Atkin; Lord Thankerton; Lord Romer; Lord Justice Clauson; **Lord Justice Luxmoore**	Appeal allowed	Ontario Court of Appeal
The Board of Education for the City of Windsor v. Ford Motor Company of Canada Limited and others	[1941] UKPC 29	"This is an appeal from a judgment of the Supreme Court of Canada who by a majority affirmed a unanimous decision of the Court of Appeal of Ontario reversing a decision of the judge of the County Court of the County of Essex, Ontario, dismissing an appeal from the Court of Revision of the City of Windsor on a complaint by the present appellant against an assessment of the respondent company for separate school purposes.	Viscount Simon, Lord Chancellor; **Lord Atkin**; Lord Thankerton; Lord Russell of Killowen; Lord Romer	Appeal allowed	Supreme Court of Canada
Port Royal Pulp and Paper Company Limited v. The Royal Bank of Canada	[1941] UKPC 30	"In this case the Supreme Court of Canada has reversed the judgment of the Supreme Court of New Brunswick Appeal Division and has restored the judgment of the trial judge. The defendant to the action has appealed to His Majesty in Council. "The relevant facts must first be stated, and they are so exceptional and peculiar to this case that, as will appear, and as appears to their Lordships, no important point of law really arises for decision on this appeal."	Viscount Simon, Lord Chancellor; Lord Thankerton; **Lord Russell of Killowen**; Lord Romer	Appeal allowed	Supreme Court of Canada
The Coca–Cola Company of Canada Limited v. Pepsi–Cola Company of Canada Limited; Pepsi–Cola Company of Canada v. The Coca–Cola Company of Canada Limited	[1942] UKPC 6	"These are consolidated appeals from a judgment of the Supreme Court of Canada delivered on appeal from a judgment of the Exchequer Court of Canada in an action for the alleged infringement of a registered trade mark, 43/10433."	Viscount Maugham; Lord Thankerton; **Lord Russell of Killowen**; Lord Macmillan; Lord Clauson	Appeal dismissed	Supreme Court of Canada
The King v. Eva May Williams and another	[1942] UKPC 11	"The question raised in the proceedings is whether certain shares which belonged at the date of his death to the late Alexander Duncan Williams, an American citizen domiciled in the city of Buffalo in the State of New York, were at the date of the death situate in the Province of Ontario within the meaning of the Succession Duty Act, 1934, of Ontario, 24 Geo. V, ch. 55, section 6(1)."	**Viscount Maugham**; Lord Thankerton; Lord Russell of Killowen; Lord Macmillan; Lord Clauson	Appeal dismissed	Ontario Court of Appeal
Jeannette Robinson Belyea and another v. Samuel A. McBride and others	[1942] UKPC 21	This appeal raises a question of very considerable difficulty as to the true construction and effect of the testamentary disposition of a testatrix (one Maria Famicha Ganong) in relation to certain shares of $100 each owned by her in the common and preferred stock of a company called Ganong Brothers Limited.	Viscount Maugham; Lord Thankerton; **Lord Russell of Killowen**; Lord Macmillan; Lord Romer	Appeal dismissed	Supreme Court of Canada
Canadian Pacific Railway Company v. Leonard Lockhart	[1942] UKPC 24	"This appeal concerns solely the responsibility of the appellant for injuries received by the infant respondent owing to the negligent driving of a motor car owned and driven by one Stinson, employed by the appellant as a carpenter and general handy-man."	Viscount Maugham; **Lord Thankerton**; Lord Russell of Killowen; Lord Macmillan; Lord Romer	Appeal dismissed	Supreme Court of Canada
David Tait and others v. Herbert Prest Winsby	[1942] UKPC 27	"The questions with which this appeal is concerned arise out a partnership which was entered into in terms of a memorandum of agreement, dated 21st March, 1935, between the appellant David Tait, a solicitor practising in Victoria, British Columbia, on behalf of his firm of Tait & Marchant, who are also appellants, and the respondent Herbert Prest Winsby, a mining broker and real estate agent in Victoria."	Lord Thankerton; Lord Russell of Killowen; **Lord Macmillan**; Lord Roche; Lord Romer	Appeal allowed	Supreme Court of Canada
The Attorney-General of Alberta v. The Attorney-General of Canada and others	[1943] UKPC 5	"This appeal by special leave is presented by the Attorney-General of Alberta against the decision of the Supreme Court of Canada dated the 2nd December, 1941, which answered certain questions concerning the constitutional validity of the Debt Adjustment Act, 1937, of the Province of Alberta as amended by five later Acts."	**Viscount Maugham**; Lord Russell of Killowen; Lord Macmillan; Lord Romer; Lord Clauson	Appeal dismissed	Supreme Court of Canada
Abitibi Power and Paper Company Limited v. Montreal Trust Company and others	[1943] UKPC 37	"This is an appeal from the Court of Appeal for Ontario who by a majority (Gillanders J. dissenting) dismissed the appeal of the appellant from an order of Middleton J.A. which ordered that all the property of the company should be sold by public auction. The question in the case is the validity of Acts of the Ontario Legislature, the Abitibi power and Paper Co. Ltd, Moratorium Act, 1942."	**Lord Atkin**; Lord Thankerton; Lord Russell of Killowen; Lord Macmillan; Lord Wright	Appeal allowed	Ontario Court of Appeal
Atlantic Smoke Shops Limited v. James H. Conlon and others	[1943] UKPC 44	"This appeal from a judgment of the Supreme Court of Canada raises the important and difficult question whether the Tobacco Tax Act of New Brunswick, 1940 (4 Geo. VI c. 44) and the Regulations made thereunder are within the powers of the provincial legislature as constituting 'Direct Taxation within the Province,' or whether, on the contrary, all or any part of these provisions must be held to be ultra vires having regard to the distribution of legislative powers effected by the British North America Act, 1867, and to the bearing of sections 121 and 122 of the Act upon provincial taxing powers."	**Viscount Simon, Lord Chancellor**; Viscount Sankey; Viscount Maugham; Lord Atkin; Lord Russell of Killowen; Lord Wright; Lord Romer	Appeal dismissed	Supreme Court of Canada
The Montreal Coke and Manufacturing Company v. The Minister of National Revenue —and— The Montreal Light Heat and Power Consolidated v. The Minister of National Revenue	[1944] UKPC 11	"The appellants in these consolidated appeals, hereinafter for brevity called 'The Coke Company' and 'The Light Company', carry on important undertakings in Canada which are financed in part by money borrowed from the public in interest-bearing bonds. At 1st January, 1935, the Coke Company had outstanding a series of 5½ percent bonds maturing in 1947 but redeemable prior to maturity at a premium."	Viscount Simon, Lord Chancellor; Lord Russell of Killowen; **Lord Macmillan**; Lord Wright; Lord Porter	Appeal dismissed	Supreme Court of Canada
Trower & Sons Limited v. Ripstein, since deceased	[1944] UKPC 29	"This is an appeal from a judgment of the Supreme Court of Canada, dated the 3rd February, 1942, whereby by a majority of three Judges (Rinfret, Crocket and Tashereau JJ.), to two Judges (Davis and Hudson JJ.), an appeal of the present respondent was allowed from a judgment of the Court of King's Bench for the Province of Quebec (Appeal Side), dated the 28th February, 1940, whereby the Judges of that Court (Letourneau, Hall, Galipeault, Walsh and Barclay, JJ.) unanimously affirmed a judgment of the Superior Court for the District of Montreal dated the 15th March, 1939, whereby Mr. Justice Décary maintained a preliminary or declinatory exception made by the present appellant and dismissed the action brought by the respondent as against the appellant, on the ground that the Superior Court did not have jurisdiction."	Viscount Simon, Lord Chancellor; Lord Macmillan; **Lord Wright**; Lord Porter; Lord Simonds	Appeal allowed	Supreme Court of Canada
Vigneaux and others v. Canadian Performing Right Society Limited	[1945] UKPC 1	"This appeal, by special leave, from the Supreme Court of Canada, raises a difficult question under the Canadian copyright legislation. The Supreme Court affirmed a decision in favour of the present respondent which had been pronounced by the Exchequer Court although as will hereafter appear the reasons for such affirmation were not unanimous. The present respondent (hereinafter referred to as the Society) is a company incorporated under the laws of the Dominion. It carries on in Canada the business of acquiring copyright in dramatico-musical and musical works or performing rights therein, and deals with or in the issue or grant of licences for the performance in Canada of such works. It owns the copyright in a musical composition called 'Star Dust'."	Viscount Maugham; **Lord Russell of Killowen**; Lord Macmillan; Lord Porter; Lord Simonds	Appeal allowed	Supreme Court of Canada
Canadian National Railways and others v. Canada Steamship Lines Ltd. and others	[1945] UKPC 18	"This appeal arises from an application presented to the Board of Transport Commissioners for Canada by the Canadian National Railways, the Canadian Pacific Railway Company and other Canadian Railways under section 35 of the Transport Act, 1938, for the approval by the Board of charges agreed between the railways and certain shippers—or 'traders' as they would be termed in English railway parlance. The agreed charges were for the carriage by rail in car-loads between eastward and westward points in Canada of specified goods which up to that time had been carried for a portion of the route by water transportation on the Great Lakes. In two of the cases the agreed charges affected 85 per cent. and 95 per cent. respectively of the traffic and in the two other cases 100 per cent."	Viscount Simon, Lord Chancellor; Lord Russell of Killowen; **Lord Macmillan**; Lord Roche; Lord Simonds	Appeal allowed	Supreme Court of Canada
The Corporation of the City of Toronto v. The Attorney General of Canada	[1945] UKPC 49	"The Attorney-General of Canada on behalf of the Minister of Finance of the Dominion and the Corporation of the City of Toronto are competitors for a sum of 155,000 dollars in the hands of the Registrar of the Supreme Court of Ontario. This sum consists of fines imposed on a number of companies convicted of contravention of Section 498 of the Criminal Code which is directed against conspiracies and combinations restrictive of industry and commerce. The prosecutions which resulted in the imposition of these fines were instituted and conducted by the Dominion Government."	Viscount Simon, Lord Chancellor; Lord Russell of Killowen; **Lord Macmillan**; Lord Porter; Lord Simonds	Appeal dismissed	Ontario Court of Appeal
The Attorney General of Ontario and others v The Canada Temperance Foundation and others	[1946] UKPC 2	"On 1st June, 1939, the Lieutenant-Governor of Ontario in Council referred to the Supreme Court of Ontario under the provisions of the Constitutional Questions Act, R.S.Ont. cap. 130, the following: 'Are Parts I, II and III of the Canada Temperance Act, Revised Statutes of Canada, 1927, cap. 196, constitutionally valid in whole or in part, and if in part, in what respect?' "On 26 September, 1939, the Supreme Court by a majority (Riddell, Fisher, McTague and Gillanders JJA.) answered the question as follows: 'This Court is of opinion (Mr. Justice Henderson dissenting) that Parts I, II and II of the Canada Temperance Act, Revised Statutes of Canada, 1927, cap. 196, are within the legislative competence of the Parliament of Canada.' "	**Viscount Simon**; Lord Thankerton; Lord Roche; Lord Greene; Lord Goddard	Appeal dismissed	Ontario Court of Appeal
Harmes and another v. Hinkson	[1946] UKPC 20	"On the 4th April, 1941, one George Harmes died at the Grey Nuns' Hospital in the city of Regina. Two days later Mr. Hinkson, the respondent to this appeal to His Majesty in Council, brought to the manager of the Canada Permanent Trust Company at its office in Regina a document which purported to be the will of George Harmes. It was dated the 3rd April, 1941, and named the Trust Company as executor.	Lord Macmillan; Lord Porter; Lord Simonds; Lord Uthwatt; **Lord Du Parcq**	Appeal dismissed	Supreme Court of Canada
British Columbia Electric Railway Company, Limited v. His Majesty The King on the information of The Attorney-General of Canada	[1946] UKPC 34	"This is an Appeal by special leave from a Judgment of the Supreme Court of Canada dated February 11th, 1946, which allowed the Appeal of the present respondent from a Judgment of the Exchequer Court of Canada, dated May 25th, 1945. The action was brought by the present respondent to recover the amount of a tax, and interest thereon, which it was alleged that the present appellant should have withheld from dividends paid to such holders of its 5 per cent. Cumulative Perpetual Preference Stock as were non-residents of Canada during the period between April 1st, 1933, and April 29th, 1941.	**Viscount Simon**; Lord Wright; Lord Porter; Lord Uthwatt; Sir Lyman Poore Duff, C.J.C.	Appeal dismissed	Supreme Court of Canada
The Treasurer of Ontario v. Mrs. Frances Eugenia Blonde and others —and— The Treasurer of Ontario v. Alice R.L. Aberdein and others	[1946] UKPC 35	"These appeals from the Court of Appeal for Ontario relate to the question of the situs to be attributed to registered shares in companies for the purposes of The Succession Duty Acts of Ontario. They may be conveniently dealt with together."	Viscount Simon; Lord Macmillan; Lord Porter; **Lord Uthwatt**; Sir Lyman Poore Duff, C.J.C.	Appeal dismissed	Ontario Court of Appeal
His Majesty the King v. Dominion Engineering Company Limited	[1946] UKPC 36	"The Crown is here the appellant in a claim to recover from the respondents, the Dominion Engineering Company Limited (hereinafter called "the Dominion Company") the sum of $10,844.46 as sales tax, together with penalties, under Section 86 of the Special War Revenue Act, Chapter 179 of the Revised Statutes of Canada, 1927, as amended by subsequent enactments.	Lord Thankerton; **Lord Macmillan**; Lord Wright; Lord Porter; Lord Uthwatt	Appeal dismissed	Supreme Court of Canada
Gooderharm and Worts, Limited v. Canadian Broadcasting Corporation	[1946] UKPC 37	"The appellants are the owners of a private radio station, originally designated by the letters CKGW, at Bowmanville, some forty miles from Toronto, which they began to operate in 1928. In 1933 the Canadian Radio Broadcasting Commission, constituted under the Canadian Radio Broadcasting Act, 1932, who were then organizing a basic network of stations across Canada, entered into negotiations with the appellants with a view to acquiring a lease of their undertaking. As a result of these negotiations the appellants and the Commission on 9th and 16th June, 1933, executed an indenture of lease 'as of' 15th May, 1933. It is with the chequered fortunes of this lease that the present litigation is concerned. Its validity, its interpretation and its effect are all in issue."	Viscount Simon; **Lord Macmillan**; Lord Porter; Lord Goddard; Lord Uthwatt	Appeal allowed in part	Ontario Court of Appeal
The Attorney-General of Canada v. The Attorney-General of the Province of Quebec —and— The Bank of Montreal v. The Attorney-General of the Province of Quebec	[1946] UKPC 43	"In this matter consolidated appeals are brought to the Judicial Committee by the Attorney-General of Canada and the Bank of Montreal from a Judgment of the Court of King's Bench for the Province of Quebec (Appeal Side) dated June 29, 1943, affirming by a majority the Judgment of the Superior Court of the Province (Demers J.) delivered on October 6th, 1941, which held the Quebec Statute entitled 'An Act Respecting Certain Vacant Property Without an Owner' (3 George VI 1939 Ch. 28) to be within the powers of the legislature of Quebec to enact and to apply to the Bank of Montreal."	Viscount Simon; Lord Wright; **Lord Porter**; Lord Uthwatt; Sir Lyman Poore Duff, C.J.C.	Appeal allowed	Quebec Court of King's Bench (Appeal Side)
City of Montreal v. Montreal Locomotive Works Limited and another	[1946] UKPC 44	"The question at issue was whether the appellant, the City of Montreal, was entitled to recover from the respondent Company certain taxes which it claimed to levy under the City Charter and Byelaws."	Viscount Simon; **Lord Wright**; Lord Porter; Lord Uthwatt; Sir Lyman Poore Duff, C.J.C.	Appeal dismissed	Supreme Court of Canada
Canada and Dominion Sugar Company, Limited v. Canadian National (West Indies) Steamships, Limited	[1946] UKPC 45	"The appellants claimed in the action as holders of a bill of lading in respect of a quantity of sugar shipped at Demerara on the respondents’ steamship Colborne for delivery at Montreal. In due course the appellants, who had purchased the sugar on c.i.f. terms, took up the bill of lading against payment of 95 per cent. of the purchase price when it was presented to them in accordance with the terms of the contract and thereupon became owners of the sugar and duly thereafter paid the balance of the price. The sugar was found to be damaged."	Lord Thankerton; Lord Macmillan; **Lord Wright**; Lord Porter; Lord Uthwatt	Appeal dismissed	Supreme Court of Canada
The Co-operative Committee on Japanese Canadians and another v The Attorney-General of Canada and another	[1946] UKPC 48	"These are appeals by special leave brought by the Co-operative Committee on Japanese Canadians and the A-G of Saskatchewan from the opinion certified on the 20th February, 1946, by the Supreme Court of Canada upon a reference ordered by the Governor General in Council under Section 55 of the Supreme Court Act, Revised Statutes of Canada 1927, cap 35. The question referred for hearing and consideration was as follows: "Are the Orders-in-Council dated the 15th December, 1945, being P.C. 7355, 7356, 7357 ultra vires of the Governor-in-Council either in whole or in part and if so in what particular or particulars, and to what extent?"	Viscount Simon; **Lord Wright**; Lord Porter; Lord Uthwatt; Sir Lyman Poore Duff, C.J.C.	Appeal dismissed	Supreme Court of Canada
Minister of National Revenue v. Wrights' Canadian Ropes Ltd	[1946] UKPC 51	This appeal relates to three assessments made against the Respondent Company Wrights' Canadian Ropes Limited under the Income War Tax Act and the Excess Profits Tax Act of the Dominion of Canada for the respondents' fiscal years 1940, 1941 and 1942.	Viscount Simon; Lord Macmillan; Lord Wright; **Lord Greene, Master of the Rolls**; Lord Simonds	Appeal dismissed	Supreme Court of Canada
The Attorney-General of Ontario and others v. The Attorney-General of Canada and others and The Attorney-General of Quebec	[1947] UKPC 1	"From the recitals contained in the Order of Reference which was made by the Governor-General in Council on the 21st April, 1939, it appears that, at the 4th Session of the Eighteenth Parliament of Canada, Bill 9, entitled 'An Act to amend the Supreme Court Act' was introduced and received first reading in the House of Commons on 23rd January, 1939 and that on April 14th of the same year the debate on the motion for the second reading of the Bill was adjourned in order that steps might be taken to obtain a judicial determination of the legislative competence of the Parliament in Canada to enact the provisions of the said Bill in whole or in part."	**Lord Jowitt, Lord Chancellor**; Viscount Simon; Lord Macmillan; Lord Wright; Lord Greene, Master of the Rolls; Lord Simonds; Lord Goddard, Lord Chief Justice of England	Appeal dismissed	Supreme Court of Canada
Alfred William Ludditt and others v. Ginger Coote Airways Limited	[1947] UKPC 4	"The three appellants were, on November 29, 1940, being carried as passengers for reward on an aeroplane, operated by the respondent company, which was flying from the city of Vancouver to Zeballos on Vancouver Island. During the flight the aeroplane caught fire. Owing, as is not now contested, to the negligence of the respondent's servants, each of the appellants was injured. The appellants severally brought action in the Supreme Court of British Columbia claiming damages for the injury which they had sustained."	Lord Macmillan; **Lord Wright**; Lord Porter; Lord Simonds; Lord Uthwatt	Appeal dismissed	Supreme Court of Canada
Fiberglass Canada Limited and others v. Spun Rock Wools Limited and another	[1947] UKPC 11	"This appeal, which is brought from a judgment of the Supreme Court of Canada reversing the judgment of the Exchequer Court of Canada, raises in the first place a question as to the validity of certain Letters Patent and in the second place questions as to the title of the appellants (the plaintiffs in the proceedings) to sue in respect of any infringement and as to the appropriate relief, if any, to be granted to them."	Lord Thankerton; Lord Porter; Lord Greene, Master of the Rolls; **Lord Simonds**; Lord Uthwatt	Appeal allowed	Supreme Court of Canada
Leo Wilfrid Vezina v. Dame Aline Trahan	[1947] UKPC 45	"This is an appeal from a judgment of the Court of King's Bench (Appeal Side) for the Province of Quebec affirming, by a majority, a judgment of the Superior Court which granted the respondent's petition against her husband, the appellant, for separation from bed and board on the ground of cruelty."	Lord Du Parcq; Lord Normand; **Lord Oaksey**; Lord Morton of Henryton	Appeal dismissed	Quebec Court of King's Bench (Appeal Side)
Attorney-General of Alberta v. Attorney-General of Canada and another —and— Attorney-General of Canada v. Attorney-General of Alberta	[1947] UKPC 59	In this matter consolidated appeals by the Attorney-General of Alberta and the Attorney-General of Canada respectively are brought before the Board from a judgment of the Supreme Court of Alberta (Appellate Division) to which, by the Order of the Lieutenant-Governor in Council of Alberta, the question of the validity of 'The Alberta Bill of Rights Act' (Chapter 11 of 1946) had been referred."	**Viscount Simon**; Lord Macmillan; Lord Oaksey; Lord Morton of Henryton; Lord Macdermott	Appeal allowed	Alberta Supreme Court (Appellate Division)
D.R. Fraser & Company Limited v. The Minister of National Revenue	[1948] UKPC 74	In the fiscal year 1940–1941 the appellant company, in pursuance of their business as lumbermen, held three Government licences under which they cut timber in three areas of the Crown Land in the Province of Alberta. In making their income tax return for the year they deducted a sum which they claimed as an allowance for depletion of the timber included in their licences at the rate of $1.40 per thousand feet of timber cut.	Viscount Simon; **Lord Macmillan**; Lord Simonds; Lord Oaksey; Lord Macdermott	Appeal dismissed	Supreme Court of Canada
The Labour Relations Board of Saskatchewan v. John East Iron Works Limited	[1948] UKPC 75	"In this appeal, which is brought from a judgment of the Court of Appeal for Saskatchewan, a question of constitutional importance is raised whether certain provisions of the Trade Union Act 1944 of the Province of Saskatchewan, which will be referred to as 'the Act', are within the legislative powers of that Province under the British North America Act 1867."	Lord Porter; **Lord Simonds**; Lord Oaksey; Lord Morton of Henryton; Lord Macdermott	Appeal allowed	Saskatchewan Court of Appeal
International Harvester Company of Canada, Ltd. v The Provincial Tax Commission and others	[1948] UKPC 81	"This is an appeal, by special leave of His Majesty in Council, from so much of the judgment of the Supreme Court of Canada dated 22nd April, 1941, as is adverse to the appellant. The appeal relates to three assessments of income tax made against the appellant on 23rd August, 1938 by the Commissioner of Income Tax of the Province of Saskatchewan ..."	Lord Porter; Lord Simonds; Lord Oaksey; **Lord Morton of Henryton**; Lord Macdermott	Appeal allowed	Supreme Court of Canada
The Attorney-General of Saskatchewan v. The Attorney-General of Canada and others	[1948] UKPC 87	"This is an Appeal by special leave from a judgment of the Supreme Court of Canada, dated 13th May, 1947 (Rinfret C.J., Kerwin, Rand and Kellock, JJ., Mr. Justice Taschereau dissenting), which answered a question propounded by the Governor General in Council concerning the constitutional validity of Section 6 of the Farm Security Act, 1944, enacted by the legislature of the Province of Saskatchewan, as amended by Section 2 of Chapter 28 of the Statutes of Saskatchewan, 1945."	**Viscount Simon**; Lord Macmillan; Lord Simonds; Lord Oaksey; Lord Macdermott	Appeal dismissed	Supreme Court of Canada
Oivind Lorentzen as Director of Shipping and Curator of the Royal Norwegian Government v. The Ship "Aloca Rambler" (Alcoa Steamship Company Inc. Owners)	[1949] UKPC 11	"This is an appeal from the unanimous decision of the Supreme Court of Canada, holding the appellants, the owners of the Norwegian steamship Norefjord solely to blame for a collision which occurred on the 20th August, 1942, between the Norefjord and the United States steamship Aloca Rambler (hereafter called the Rambler) the owners of which were respondents in the Appeal.	Present at the Hearing: Viscount Simon; **Lord Wright**; Lord Roche; Lord Porter; Lord Du Parcq Nautical Assessors: Captain W.E. Crumplin; Captain D. Dunn	Appeal dismissed	Supreme Court of Canada
William Yachuk and Another v. The Oliver Blais Company Limited —and— The Oliver Blais Company Limited v. Yachuk and Another	[1949] UKPC 21	William Yachuk, an infant who sued by his father as next friend, and Tony Yachuk (the father suing in his own right) were plaintiffs, and the Oliver Blais Company Limited was defendant, in an action begun in January, 1943, in the Supreme Court of Ontario.	Viscount Simon; Lord Porter; **Lord Du Parcq**; Lord Macdermott	Appeal allowed	Supreme Court of Canada
The Provincial Treasurer of Manitoba v. Wm. Wrigley Jr. Company Limited	[1949] UKPC 43	"This is an appeal from a judgment of the Supreme Court of Canada dated 18th June, 1947. The Supreme Court judgment had reversed a judgment of the Court of Appeal for the Province of Manitoba dated 19th September, 1945, and by so doing had restored a judgment of the Court of King's Bench in Manitoba dated 10th March, 1943. The purpose of the appeal to their Lordships therefore is to upset the judgment of the Court of King's Bench."	Lord Greene; Lord Morton of Henryton; Lord Macdermott; Lord Reid; **Lord Radcliffe**	Appeal dismissed	Supreme Court of Canada
Abasand Oil Limited v. The Boiler Inspection and Insurance Company of Canada	[1949] UKPC 47	"This is an Appeal by special leave from a Judgment of a majority of the Supreme Court of Canada dated 13th April, 1948, allowing the respondent's Appeal from the Judgment of a majority of the Supreme Court of Alberta, Appellate Division, dated the 24th December, 1946, which affirmed a judgment of Shepherd J. in the Supreme Court of Alberta, Trial Division, dated 25th July, 1945. By his Judgment Shepherd J. awarded the appellants $100,000 under a policy of insurance issued to the appellant by the respondent."	**Lord Porter**; Lord Greene; Lord Morton of Henryton; Lord Macdermott; Lord Radcliffe	Appeal allowed	Supreme Court of Canada
Attorney-General of British Columbia v. Esquimalt and Nanaimo Railway Company and others	[1949] UKPC 48	"In the year 1883 an outstanding question between the Province of British Columbia and the Dominion of Canada with regard to the construction of a railway on Vancouver Island, originally contemplated as part of the C.P.R. transcontinental route, was finally put to rest by means of an agreed scheme."	Viscount Simon; **Lord Greene**; Lord Oaksey; Lord Morton of Henryton; The Rt. Hon. Thibaudeau Rinfret, C.J.C.	Appeal allowed	Supreme Court of Canada
Canadian Pacific Railway Company v. The Attorney-General of British Columbia	[1949] UKPC 58	"In 1946 the legislature of the Province of British Columbia enacted an amendment of the Hours of Work Act, under which it is provided that the working hours of an employee in any industrial undertaking shall not exceed 8 in the day and 44 in the week. The appellant owns and manages the Empress Hotel in Victoria, B.C. and the definition of industrial undertaking in the Hours of Work Act is such as to include a large number of the appellant's employees who work in that hotel."	Lord Porter; Lord Greene; Lord Morton of Henryton; **Lord Reid**; The Rt. Hon. Thibaudeau Rinfret, C.J.C.	Appeal dismissed	Supreme Court of Canada

== Summary by year and result ==
Year	Number of Cases	Appeal Allowed		Appeal Dismissed	
1940	4	2	50.0%	2	50.0%
1941	3	3	100.0%	0	0.0%
1942	5	1	20.0%	4	80.0%
1943	3	1	33.3%	2	66.7%
1944	2	1	50.0%	1	50.0%
1945	3	2	66.7%	1	33.3%
1946	11	2	18.2%	9	81.8%
1947	5	2	40.0%	3	60.0%
1948	4	2	50.0%	2	50.0%
1949	6	3	50.0%	3	50.0%
Total Cases	46	19	41.3%	27	58.7%
Yearly Averages	4.6	1.9		2.7	

== Summary by jurisdiction and court appealed from ==
Jurisdiction	Number of Cases	On Appeal from Supreme Court of Canada		On Appeal from Other Courts	
Federal	15	15	100.0%	0	0.0%
Ontario	10	3	30.0%	7	70.0%
Quebec	4	2	50.0%	2	50.0%
Nova Scotia	0	0	0.0%	0	0.0%
New Brunswick	4	4	100.0%	0	0.0%
Manitoba	1	1	100.0%	0	0.0%
British Columbia	5	1	20.0%	4	80.0%
Prince Edward Island	0	0	0.0%	0	0.0%
Saskatchewan	3	2	66.7%	1	33.3%
Alberta	4	2	50.0%	2	50.0%
Newfoundland	0	0	0.0%	0	0.0%
North-West Territories	0	0	0.0%	0	0.0%
Yukon	0	0	0.0%	0	0.0%
Total	46	30	65.2%	16	34.8%

== See also ==
- List of Canadian appeals to the Judicial Committee of the Privy Council, 1867–1869
- List of Canadian appeals to the Judicial Committee of the Privy Council, 1870–1879
- List of Canadian appeals to the Judicial Committee of the Privy Council, 1880–1889
- List of Canadian appeals to the Judicial Committee of the Privy Council, 1890–1899
- List of Canadian appeals to the Judicial Committee of the Privy Council, 1900–1909
- List of Canadian appeals to the Judicial Committee of the Privy Council, 1910–1919
- List of Canadian appeals to the Judicial Committee of the Privy Council, 1920–1929
- List of Canadian appeals to the Judicial Committee of the Privy Council, 1930–1939
- List of Canadian appeals to the Judicial Committee of the Privy Council, 1950–1959

== Sources ==
- British and Irish Legal Information Institute: Privy Council Decisions
- 1940 Privy Council Decisions
- 1941 Privy Council Decisions
- 1942 Privy Council Decisions
- 1943 Privy Council Decisions
- 1944 Privy Council Decisions
- 1945 Privy Council Decisions
- 1946 Privy Council Decisions
- 1947 Privy Council Decisions
- 1948 Privy Council Decisions
- 1949 Privy Council Decisions
