= Robert Younger =

Robert Younger may refer to:

- Bob Younger (1853–1889), American outlaw and member of the James-Younger gang
- Robert Younger, Baron Blanesburgh (1861–1946), Scottish law lord
- Rob Younger, Australian rock musician
