= Wake-Walker =

Wake-Walker may refer to:

- Baldwin Wake Walker (1802–1876), surveyor of the Royal Navy
- Frederic Wake-Walker (1888–1945), British Royal Navy Admiral

== See also ==
- Wake-Walker v SS Colin W Ltd, Canadian Admiralty law case
