= William Chaplin =

William Chaplin may refer to:

- William Chaplin (coach proprietor), British stage coach proprietor and politician
- William L. Chaplin, American abolitionist
- William Robert Chaplin, U.K. government official
