= Wake-Walker v SS Colin W Ltd =

Admiralty case from Canada – JCPC

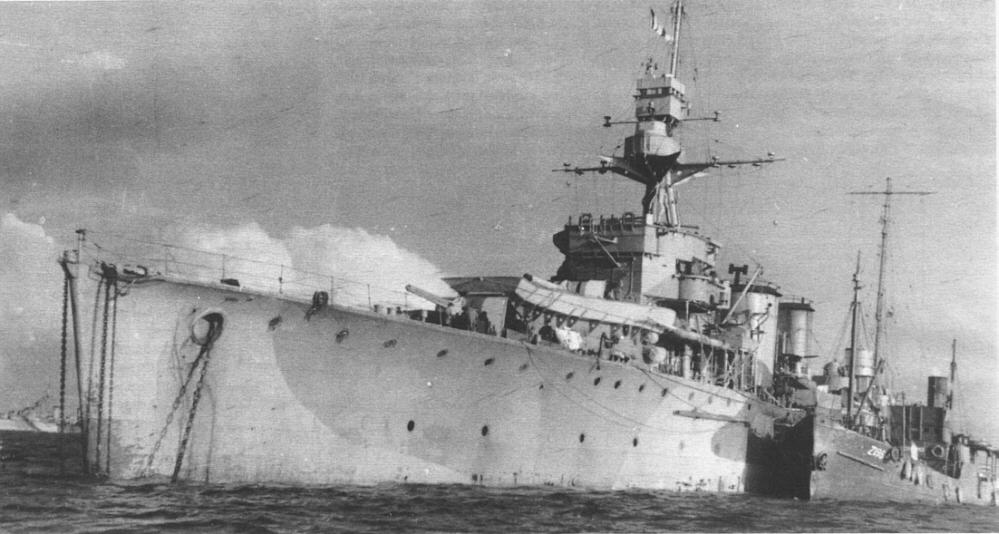
- HMS Dragon, the ship commanded by Captain Wake-Walker in the collision
- Court: Judicial Committee of the Privy Council
- Full case name: Captain W. F. Wake-Walker O.B.E. R.N. v Steamer Colin W. Limited and others
- Decided: April 15, 1937
- Citations: [1937] UKPC 49, [1937] 2 DLR 753 (PC), [1937] 58 Ll L Rep. 11

Case history
- Prior actions: Wake-Walker v. Steamer Colin W. Ltd., [1936] SCR 624
- Appealed from: Supreme Court of Canada

Court membership
- Judges sitting: Viscount Sankey; Lord Blanesburgh; Lord Merrivale; Lord Atkin; Lord Macmillan; Nautical Assessors: Captain Mackay; Captain W.R. Chaplin

Case opinions
- Decision by: Viscount Sankey

Keywords
- Admiralty law; inevitable accident

Wake-Walker v SS Colin W Ltd is a Canadian admiralty law case concerning the issue of inevitable accident. The case was decided by the Judicial Committee of the Privy Council, in an appeal affirming a ruling by the Supreme Court of Canada.

== The collision between HMS Dragon and the Maplebranch ==
On August 13, 1934, HMS Dragon under the command of Captain Frederic Wake-Walker was entering the Market (or Victoria) Basin in the harbour of Montreal, Quebec, Canada. After entering the basin, it attempted to avoid colliding into the Saguenay Trader, but it subsequently collided with an oil bunkering steamer, the Maplebranch, which was securely moored at the time of the collision. The Maplebranch sank. The owners of the Maplebranch sued Wake-Walker for the damages to the Maplebranch and its cargo.

== Decisions of the Canadian courts ==
=== Exchequer Court ===
The admiralty action was heard by Mr. Justice Demers of the Exchequer Court of Canada (Quebec Admiralty District), assisted by two nautical assessors. The plaintiffs alleged that the collision was caused solely by the improper and negligent navigation and mismanagement of Dragon by Wake-Walker. In his defence, Wake-Walker pleaded inevitable accident, said to be caused by the maneuvering of the Saguenay Trader, which Wake-Walker was trying to avoid hitting. On June 21, 1935, Demers J. held that Wake-Walker was liable.

=== Supreme Court of Canada ===
On a 3-2 majority, the Supreme Court of Canada upheld the finding of liability. In his opinion for the majority, Davis J. held that when a vessel under steam collides with a moored vessel, the commander of the vessel under steam is presumed liable for the collision, and has the onus of proving that he was not negligent. Wake-Walker had not done so. In summary, the majority stated:

While I think the onus lay throughout the case upon the appellant to satisfy the Court that there was no fault upon him which directly caused the collision, the learned judge has affirmatively found that there was such fault; and where the trial judge, as here, is not only an experienced local Judge in Admiralty but had the assistance of two assessors to advise him upon matters requiring nautical or other professional knowledge and arrived at a conclusion of fact upon conflicting testimony, it would need a very clear case of error for this Court, without the assistance of any assessors, to reverse such a finding.

== Appeal to the Judicial Committee of the Privy Council ==
Wake-Walker then appealed to the Judicial Committee of the Privy Council, at that time the highest court of appeal for the British Commonwealth, including Canada. His appeal was dismissed by the Judicial Committee of the Privy Council. The opinion was delivered by Viscount Sankey which noted:

In their Lordships' view the real question is that which Mr Justice Demers proposed to himself and which the Supreme Court of Canada also proposed to themselves: "Has the defendant established that this was an inevitable accident?" It was contended by the learned counsel that there was no duty upon him to anticipate the movement of the Saguenay Trader in the Basin. Their Lordships, however, are of opinion that whatever may have been the right of the defendant, after he had received notice from the Harbour authorities, to expect an empty berth, he had no right to expect an empty Basin, or a Basin either devoid of ships or with ships absolutely motionless.

Therefore, the Privy Council agreed with the courts below that Wake-Walker had not discharged the onus to prove that the accident had been inevitable.

== Subsequent career ==
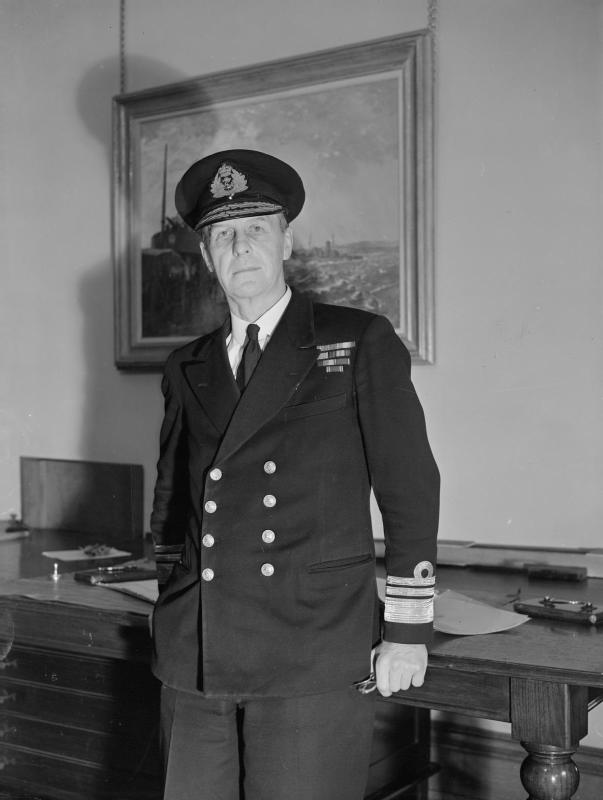
Vice Admiral Sir W Frederic Wake-Walker, Third Sea Lord, 1944

In spite of the finding of liability, Wake-Walker continued to rise in the Royal Navy. Promoted to rear-admiral in 1939, he was involved in Operation Dynamo, the evacuation of Dunkirk in 1940. Ships under his command played a key role in hunting the Bismarck in 1942, and he was heavily involved in creating the flotilla of landing craft needed for Operation Torch in North Africa, and later the Normandy landings on D-Day.
