= George Lowndes =

Sir George Rivers Lowndes KCSI, KC, PC

Judge

Personal details
- Born: 1862
- Died: 1943 (aged 80–81)

Sir George Rivers Lowndes, KCSI, KC, PC (1862–1943), was a lawyer and judge in British India, who served as Advocate-General of Bombay and Minister of Law as Law Member of the Viceregal Executive Council, during which time he chaired the select committee tasked in with the general revision of the Indian criminal code.

Lowndes was the son of The Rev. Richard Lowndes, Vicar of Sturminster, and his wife Ann Harriet née Kaye. He married Hilda Julia Forbes on 3 September 1896 at Sturminster, Dorset. Their eldest son Richard Forbes Lowndes was killed aged 19 on 14 November 1916 at the Somme, France. He was related to the freemason Major Richard Charles Lowndes MC.

He practised before the High Court of Bombay. Upon his return to the United Kingdom, he was appointed to the Judicial Committee of the Privy Council in 1929, at that time the court of last resort for the British Empire. He retired from the Judicial Committee in 1934, being replaced by Sir Lancelot Sanderson, a former Chief Justice of the High Court of Calcutta.
