= Frank Russell, Baron Russell of Killowen =

British judge (1867-1946)

The Right Honourable The Lord Russell of Killowen PC
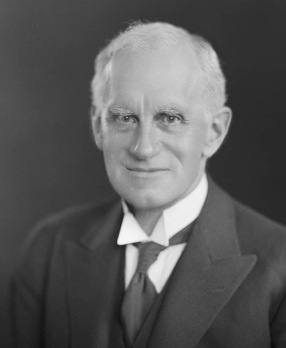
- Russell in 1928 by Lafayette

Lord of Appeal in Ordinary
- In office 18 November 1929 – 6 January 1946
- Preceded by: The Lord Carson
- Succeeded by: The Lord Uthwatt

Lord Justice of Appeal
- In office 1928–1929
- Preceded by: Sir Charles Sargant
- Succeeded by: Sir Mark Romer

Justice of the High Court
- In office 1919–1928
- Preceded by: Sir Robert Younger
- Succeeded by: Sir Frederic Maugham

Personal details
- Born: Francis Xavier Joseph Russell; 2 July 1867
- Died: 20 December 1946 (aged 79)
- Spouse: Mary Emily Ritchie (m. 1900)
- Children: 1 son; Charles Ritchie Russell
- Parent: Charles Russell (father)
- Relatives: Charles Ritchie (father-in-law)
- Education: Beaumont College
- Alma mater: Oriel College, Oxford

Francis Xavier Joseph Russell, Baron Russell of Killowen, PC, known as Frank Russell (2 July 1867 – 20 December 1946) was a British judge.

== Early life and career at the bar ==
The fourth son of Charles Russell, Baron Russell of Killowen, the Lord Chief Justice of England, and of Ellen Mulholland, Frank Russell was educated at Beaumont College and Oriel College, Oxford, where he gained a First in Jurisprudence in 1890. He was active in the Oxford Union, and in 1887 made a speech in favour of Home Rule that led A. V. Dicey, an opponent of Home Rule, to write a letter of congratulations to his father.

He was called to the bar by Lincoln's Inn in 1893. He practised at the Chancery bar in the chambers of Matthew Ingle Joyce. In 1908 he was appointed a king's counsel. As was customary for Chancery silks, Russell attached himself to the court of one Chancery Division judge, first to the court of Mr Justice Swinfen Eady, then to that of Mr Justice Astbury. His practice was very successful, and in 1918 he became one of the 'specials' at the Chancery bar, i.e. a barrister who charged a £50 extra fee for any court appearance.

== Judicial career ==
In 1919 Russell, a Roman Catholic, appeared in front of the House of Lords in Bourne v Keane [1919] AC 815, in which the Lords overturned the rule that a bequest for masses for the dead was void for being "for superstitious uses". Lord Birkenhead, who had heard the case, was so impressed by Russell's performance that he arranged for him to be appointed to the Chancery Division of the High Court the same year. Unusually, upon appointment Russell declined the customary knighthood because, as the son of a peer, he outranked a knight bachelor.

In 1928 he was promoted to the Court of Appeal as a Lord Justice of Appeal. He was sworn of the Privy Council on 7 May 1928. A year later, on 18 November 1929, he was appointed Lord of Appeal in Ordinary and became a life peer as Baron Russell of Killowen, of Killowen in the County Down, the same his father already had and his son would have. He resigned in 1946 for health reasons and died the same year.

Russell married at the Brompton Oratory on 17 February 1900 Mary Emily Ritchie, daughter of Charles Ritchie, 1st Baron Ritchie of Dundee. They had one son, Charles Ritchie Russell, Baron Russell of Killowen, who would also be appointed a Lord of Appeal in Ordinary (in 1975).

== Notable judgments ==
- Inland Revenue Commissioners v Duke of Westminster [1936] AC 1
- Regal (Hastings) Ltd v Gulliver [1942] 1 All ER 378

== Arms ==
Coat of arms of Frank Russell, Baron Russell of Killowen
Crest A Goat passant Argent armed Or charged on the body with three Trefoils slipped fesswise Vert Escutcheon Argent a Lion rampant Gules on a chief Sable three Escallops of the field the whole within a Bordure engrailed Vert Supporters Dexter: A Goat Or semée of Trefoils slipped Vert and gorged with a Collar Gemel Gules; Sinister: A Lion reguardant Or semée of Escallops Gules and gorged with a like collar Motto Che sera sera (What will be, will be)
