= George Rankin (judge) =

British judge

Sir George Claus Rankin
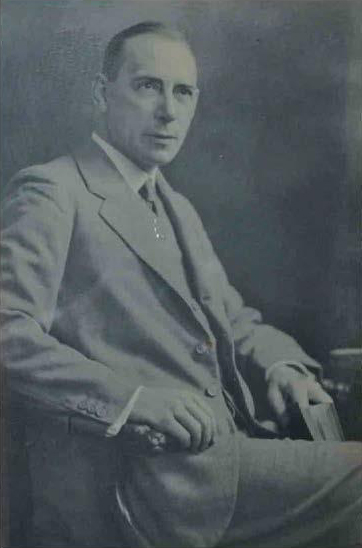

8th Chief Justice of Calcutta High Court
- In office 1926–1934
- Appointed by: George V
- Preceded by: Lancelot Sanderson
- Succeeded by: Harold Derbyshire

Judge of Calcutta High Court
- In office 1918–1926
- Appointed by: George V

Personal details
- Born: 12 August 1877 Lamington, South Lanarkshire
- Died: 8 April 1946 (aged 68)
- Education: M.A.
- Alma mater: University of Edinburgh; Trinity College, Cambridge
- Occupation: Lawyer, Judge
- Profession: Chief Justice

Sir George Claus Rankin PC (12 August 1877 – 8 April 1946) was a British judge in colonial India.

Rankin was born in Lamington, Lanarkshire, the son of Rev. Robert Rankin. He was educated at the University of Edinburgh, where he graduated M.A., and where his essay on “Democracy in literature” was awarded the Edinburgh University Club of London Triennial Prize in 1898, and Trinity College, Cambridge. He was admitted at Lincoln's Inn and called to the bar in 1904. He served in the First World War with the Royal Garrison Artillery.

He went to India in 1918 and served first as a puisne judge of the High Court of Calcutta, and then as Chief Justice, from 1926 to 1934. While in India, in 1919 he was given a temporary commission as Major in the Calcutta University Infantry of the Indian Defence Force.

Upon his return to Britain, he was sworn to the Privy Council, entitling him to sit on the Judicial Committee of the Privy Council, at that time the court of last resort for India and other parts of the British Empire.

== Arms ==
Coat of arms of George Rankin
Motto Super Flumina

== Publications ==
- George Claus Rankin, Background to Indian Law (Cambridge: University Press, 1946).

Legal offices
Preceded by Sir Lancelot Sanderson	Chief Justice of Bengal; 1926–1934	Succeeded by Sir Harold Derbyshire
