= Adair Roche, Baron Roche =

British barrister and law lord

The Right Honourable The Lord Roche PC
- Lord Justice Roche in 1934

Lord of Appeal in Ordinary
- In office 14 October 1935 – 5 January 1938
- Preceded by: The Lord Wright
- Succeeded by: The Lord Romer

Lord Justice of Appeal

Justice of the High Court

Personal details
- Born: Alexander Adair Roche Ipswich, Suffolk
- Died: Chadlington, Oxfordshire
- Education: Wadham College, Oxford

Alexander Adair Roche, Baron Roche PC (24 July 1871 – 22 December 1956) was a British barrister and law lord.

== Early life and education ==
Born in Ipswich, Adair Roche was the second son of William Brock Roche (died 1925), a doctor, and his wife Mary Roche, née Fraser (died 1928), daughter of William Fraser. Roche was educated at Ipswich School and Wadham College, Oxford, where he was a classical scholar. He obtained first-class honours in both the honour moderations (1892) and in literae humaniores (1894), graduating with a Bachelor of Arts in 1894 and a Master of Arts in 1913. At Wadham, he was a contemporary of F. E. Smith and John Simon, both of whom became lord chancellor.

== Legal career ==
After working in the office of his uncle, a solicitor who specialised in maritime law, Roche read as a pupil with Scott Fox of the North-Eastern Circuit. He was called to the bar by the Inner Temple in 1896 and went to the North-Eastern Circuit. At first, he took both civil and criminal work, but soon specialised in commercial cases. At the time, there was still much commercial work and some Admiralty work in courts in the north of England, and Roche eventually began to get corresponding commercial work in London as well.

Roche became a King's Counsel in 1912, and henceforth concentrated almost exclusively on commercial case and arbitration in London, acquiring one of the largest practices in the field at the bar. The outbreak of the First World War brought further in the prize courts and in the Privy Council. He was elected a bencher of his inn in 1917.

== Career ==
In 1917, Roche was appointed to the High Court of Justice (King's Bench Division), on which occasion he was created a Knight Bachelor. He served as chairman of the Oxfordshire Quarter Sessions from 1932 and held the same post in the Central Agricultural Wages Board from 1940.

In 1934, Roche was made a Lord Justice of Appeal and was sworn of the Privy Council. On 14 October 1935 to fill a vacancy he was made a Lord of Appeal in Ordinary and created a life peerage as Baron Roche, of Chadlington in the County of Oxford. Roche resigned in 1938 and a year thereafter he became Treasurer of the Inner Temple.

He subsequently chaired a Departmental Committee on justices' clerks which reported in 1944 to the Home Secretary Herbert Morrison, recommending setting up Magistrates' Courts Committees and other reforms. This formed the basis of the Justices of the Peace Act 1949, introduced by Morrison's successor, James Chuter Ede.

== Family ==
On 22 March 1902, he married Elfreda Gabriel, third daughter of John Fenwick and had by her two sons and a daughter.
