= Lancelot Sanderson =

British politician and judge

Sir Lancelot Sanderson KCIE
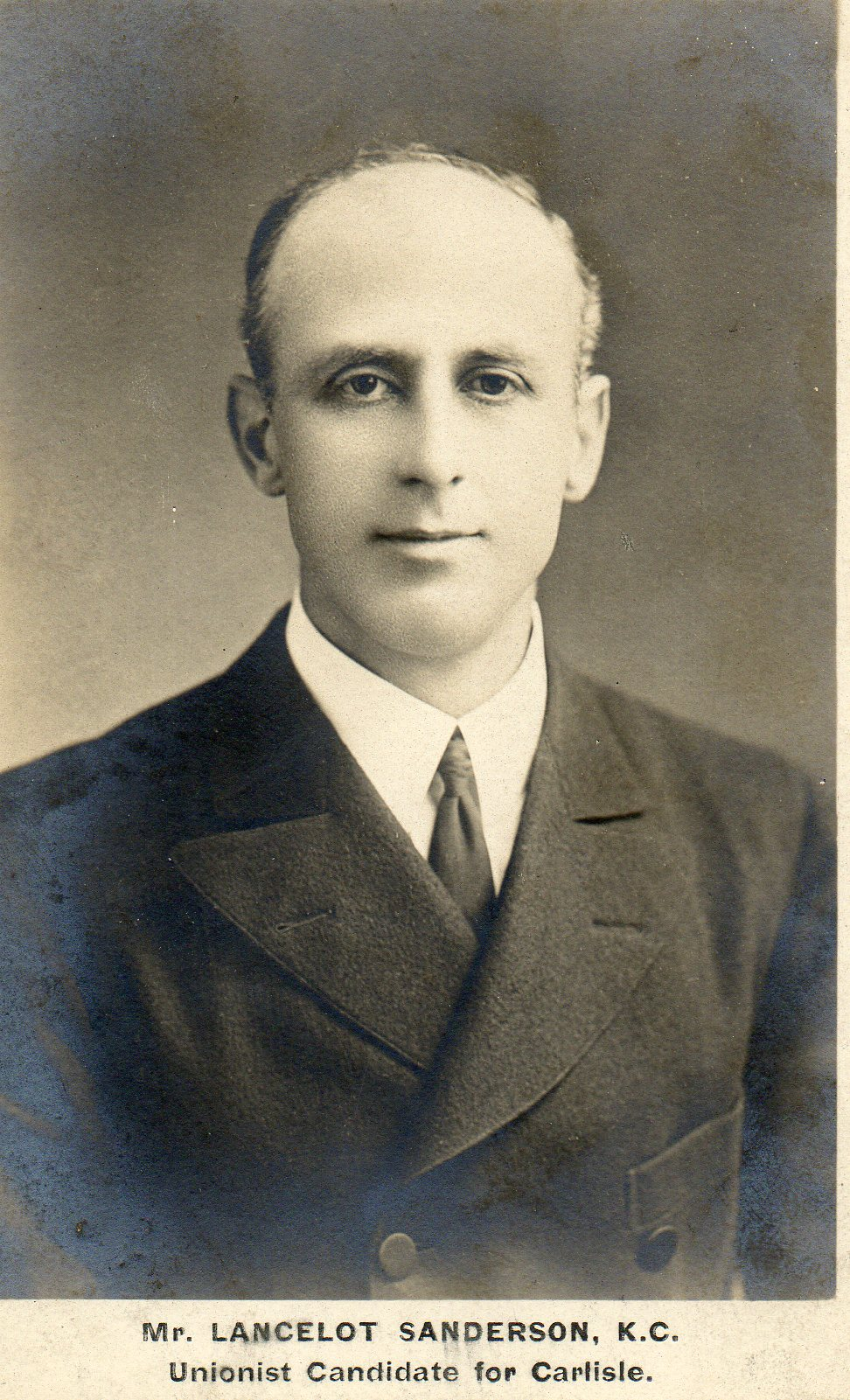

7th Chief Justice of Calcutta High Court
- In office 13 November 1915 – November 1926
- Appointed by: George V
- Preceded by: Lawrence Hugh Jenkins
- Succeeded by: George Claus Rankin

Member of House of Commons
- In office 1910–1915
- Monarchs: Edward VII; George V
- Preceded by: Leif Jones
- Succeeded by: Cecil Lowther
- Constituency: Appleby

Personal details
- Born: 24 October 1863
- Died: 9 March 1944 (aged 80)

Sir Lancelot Sanderson KC (24 October 1863 – 9 March 1944) was a British Conservative politician and judge in British India.

A barrister of the Inner Temple, he was appointed Recorder of Wigan in 1901 and took silk in 1903. He was elected as Member of Parliament (MP) for the Appleby division of Westmorland at the January 1910 general election, regaining a formerly Conservative seat which had been held by Liberal MPs since 1900. He was re-elected in the general election of December 1910, but resigned his seat and recordership in October 1915, when he was appointed Chief Justice of the High Court of Judicature in Calcutta after Justice Lawrence Hugh Jenkins. Upon his resignation from that position in 1926, Sanderson was appointed to the Privy Council and sat on the Judicial Committee of the Privy Council from 1934 until 1935. He died in Lancaster aged 80.

Sanderson was also a cricketer. He played two first-class matches; the first for Lancashire in 1884, and the second for the Marylebone Cricket Club four years later.

Parliament of the United Kingdom
Preceded by Leif Jones	Member of Parliament for Appleby; January 1910 – 1915	Succeeded by Cecil Lowther
Legal offices
Preceded by Sir Lawrence Hugh Jenkins	Chief Justice of Bengal; 1915–1926	Succeeded by Sir George Claus Rankin
