= William Robert Chaplin =

William Robert Chaplin, CBE, was a former Warden of Trinity House, a non-departmental public body of the United Kingdom responsible for maritime safety.

He was the first member of the Australian Merchant Service to be elected to the Corporation of Trinity House, in 1928. He was an active member of the Board of Trinity House until his retirement in 1958. As part of his functions, he often served as a nautical assessor in the British courts, including in the Judicial Committee of the Privy Council.
