= Robert Younger, Baron Blanesburgh =

British barrister and judge

The Right Honourable The Lord Blanesburgh GBE PC
- Portrait of Lord Blanesburgh, by Hugh Goldwin Rivière.

Lord of Appeal in Ordinary
- In office 12 October 1923 – 27 April 1937
- Preceded by: The Viscount Cave
- Succeeded by: The Lord Wright

Lord Justice of Appeal
- In office 1919–1923
- Preceded by: Sir Henry Duke
- Succeeded by: Sir Charles Sargant

Justice of the High Court
- In office 1915–1919
- Preceded by: Sir Thomas Warrington

Personal details
- Education: Balliol College, Oxford

Robert Younger, Baron Blanesburgh (12 September 1861 – 17 August 1946) was a British barrister and judge. The scion of a Scottish brewing family, he practised at the bar of England and Wales, before being appointed to the High Court in 1915, the Court of Appeal in 1919, and the House of Lords in 1923. He served as a law lord until 1937, when failing eyesight forced his retirement.

== Biography ==
The son of James Younger and Janet McEwan (both from important Scottish brewing families), and younger brother of the 1st Viscount Younger of Leckie, he was educated at Edinburgh Academy and Balliol College, Oxford, where he graduated with a Bachelor of Arts in 1883, and with a Master of Arts in 1909.

In 1884 Younger was called to the Bar by the Inner Temple. He was appointed a Queen's Counsel in January 1900, and became a Bencher of Lincoln's Inn in 1907. Between 1915 and 1919, he was High Court Judge, Chancery Division. Invested as a privy counsellor on 25 November 1919, he was Lord Justice of Appeal from 1919 to 1923. On 12 October 1923, he was appointed Lord of Appeal in Ordinary and was created a life peer with the title Baron Blanesburgh, of Alloa in the County of Clackmannanshire. As a judge, Blanesburgh was noted for his formalism. He retired in 1937 due to poor eyesight.

Having been knighted on 20 April 1915, he was made a Knight Grand Cross of the Order of the British Empire (GBE) in 1917. Younger was a fellow of the Royal College of Music and received honorary doctorates of the University of Oxford, University of St Andrews and the University of Edinburgh. In 1932, he became further Treasurer of Lincoln's Inn. He died aged 84, having never married.

== Trivia ==
Lord Blanesburgh presented the west stained glass window, representing the Tree of Jesse, in Dunblane Cathedral in 1906 in memory of his mother, Janet McEwan. It was designed and created by Clayton and Bell of London.

== Arms ==
Coat of arms of Robert Younger, Baron Blanesburgh
Crest An armed leg couped at the thigh proper garnished and spurred Or. Escutcheon Per saltire Or and Gules a rose counterchanged in base a martlet Sable on a chief indented also Sable three covered cups Or. Supporters Dexter, the figure of St Blane; Sinister, an Ermine both proper standing upon a mount set with thistles. Motto Celer Et Audax (Quick And Bold)
