= List of Canadian appeals to the Judicial Committee of the Privy Council, 1910–1919 =

List of Canadian appeals to the JCPC (1910–1919)

This page lists all cases of the Judicial Committee of the Privy Council originating in Canada, and decided in the years 1910 to 1919.

From 1867 to 1949, the Judicial Committee of the Privy Council was the highest court of appeal for Canada. Its decisions on appeals from Canadian courts had binding legal precedent on all Canadian courts, including the Supreme Court of Canada. The Supreme Court was required to follow the cases of the Judicial Committee, and the Judicial Committee could overturn decisions of the Supreme Court. The Judicial Committee decisions were the ultimate judicial authority for the Canadian courts, and had a considerable influence on the development of Canadian law, particularly constitutional law.

== Case list ==
Case name	Citation	Subject (Exact Text from Judgment)	Judges (Author of decision in bold)	Appeal Allowed or Dismissed?	On Appeal from
Sally Wertheim v. The Chicoutimi Pulp Company	[1910] UKPC 9	"This is an Appeal from a Judgment of the Court of King's Bench for the Province of Quebec (Appeal Side), dated the 3rd October 1908, affirming in part and reversing in part a Judgment of the Superior Court of that Province, dated the 12th November 1907. By the former Judgment the Respondent Company was condemned in a sum of $2,434 and costs."	Lord Macnaghten; **Lord Atkinson**; Lord Collins; Lord Shaw	Appeal allowed in part	Quebec Court of King's Bench (Appeal Side)
The Florence Mining Company, Limited v. The Cobalt Lake Mining Company, Limited	[1910] UKPC 11	"This is an Appeal from the decision of the Court of Appeal for Ontario affirming the Judgment of Riddell J., dismissing a claim by the Plaintiff Company, as assignees of one W.J. Green, to be entitled to certain lands and minerals situate under the waters of Cobalt Lake, in the Province of Ontario, and constituting claim J.S. 71, containing about 20 acres, which claim was alleged to have been discovered by W.J. Green and duly staked out as a mining claim in accordance with the Mines Act and regulations passed thereunder."	Lord Macnaghten; Lord Atkinson; **Lord Collins**; Lord Shaw	Appeal dismissed	Court of Appeal for Ontario
The Corporation of the City of Toronto v. The Toronto Railway Company	[1910] UKPC 12	"This is a singular Appeal and, in their Lordships' opinion, a very idle one. In form it is an Appeal from an order of the Court of Appeal for Ontario dismissing an Appeal from an Order of the Ontario Railway and Municipal Board. In substance it is an attempt to avoid or impugn an Order of His Majesty in Council and to re-open a question finally determined in a litigation between the parties to the present controversy the City of Toronto and the Toronto Railway Company."	**Lord Macnaghten**; Lord Atkinson; Lord Collins; Lord Shaw	Appeal dismissed	Court of Appeal for Ontario
Clara B. Jones and another v. The North Vancouver Land and Improvement Company, Limited Liability	[1910] UKPC 13	"This is an Appeal from the Judgment of the Supreme Court of British Columbia, dated the 7th June, 1909, affirming the Judgment of the Trial Judge, Mr. Justice Clements, who dismissed the action with costs. The Suit, considering the relationship of the parties (they are husband and wife), and the conduct and action of the male Plaintiff, is somewhat peculiar in its incidents."	Lord Macnaghten; **Lord Atkinson**; Lord Collins; Lord Shaw	Appeal dismissed	Supreme Court of British Columbia
The English and American Shipping Company, Limited, Owners of the Ship "Mystic," and her master and crew v. The Ship "Nanna" her cargo and freight	[1910] UKPC 23	"This is an Appeal from an Order of the Supreme Court of Canada which varied a Decree of McDonald, J., sitting as Local Judge in Admiralty for the Nova Scotia Admiralty District. That learned Judge had made an award of $25,000 in favour of the Owners, Master and crew of the s.s. 'Mystic for salvage services rendered to the s.s. 'Nanna,' in the course of which the 'Mystic' herself sustained serious damage. His opinion was that 'the damage to the 'Mystic' was caused by the necessities of the service, and was not attributable to the fault of the salvors.' "	Present at the Hearing: **Lord Macnaghten**; Lord Atkinson; Lord Collins; Lord Shaw Nautical Assessors: Admiral Sir Archibald L. Douglas G.C.V.O., K.C.B. Commander W.F. Caborne, C.B., R.N.R.	Appeal dismissed	Supreme Court of Canada
J.C. Thompson v. The Equity Fire Insurance Company and The Union Bank of Canada	[1910] UKPC 36	"The Appellant, J.C. Thompson, was the owner of a building in New Liskeard, Ontario which was insured against fire with the Respondents, the Equity Fire Insurance Company. On the 4th of September 1906 the building was burnt down. A claim was made under the policy. It was resisted on various grounds which have all been disposed of but one."	**Lord Macnaghten**; Lord Atkinson; Lord Shaw; Lord Mersey	Appeal allowed	Supreme Court of Canada
The Montreal Light, Heat, and Power Company v. H.B. Sedgwick and others	[1910] UKPC 38	"This is an appeal from an Order of the Supreme Court of Canada, dated the 4th of May 1909, reversing an Order of the Court of Review of the Province of Quebec, dated the 22nd April 1908, and directing a new trial of an action brought by the Appellants (Plaintiffs) against the Respondents (Defendants) on a certain policy of insurance, dated the 15th May 1903, to recover the sum of $2,700 damages in respect of the total loss of cargo of cement claimed to be covered by the policy."	Lord Macnaghten; **Lord Atkinson**; Lord Shaw; Lord Mersey; Sir Henri Elzéar Taschereau	Appeal dismissed	Supreme Court of Canada
The Dominion of Canada v. The Province of Ontario	[1910] UKPC 40	"In this Appeal the only question was whether or not the Dominion of Canada is entitled to recover from the Province of Ontario a proper proportion of annuities and other monies which the Dominion bound itself in the name of the Crown to pay to an Indian tribe and its chiefs under a treaty of the 3rd October 1873."	**Lord Loreburn, Lord Chancellor**; Lord Macnaghten; Lord Atkinson; Lord Shaw; Lord Mersey	Appeal dismissed	Supreme Court of Canada
Charles R. Gordon v. Thomas Horne and others	[1910] UKPC 41	"This is an Appeal from a Judgment of the Supreme Court of Canada, dated the 28th May 1909. That Judgment, by a majority of three Judges to two, reversed the judgment of the Supreme Court of British Columbia, dated the 11th December 1908, whereby, by a majority of two Judges to one, that Court had reversed the Judgment of the Trial Judge, Mr. Justice Morrison, who had dismissed the action with costs."	Lord Macnaghten; Lord Atkinson; Lord Shaw; **Lord Mersey**	Appeal allowed	Supreme Court of Canada
James Francis White and another v. The Victoria Lumber and Manufacturing Company, Limited	[1910] UKPC 42	"This is an Appeal from a Judgment of the Full Court of the Supreme Court of British Columbia, dated the 7th September 1909, setting aside a Judgment by Clement, J., in favour of the Appellants, dated the 14th March 1908, and ordering a new trial of the cause. The Respondents own and work a short mountain railway used for bringing timber down from the uplands in the interior to Chemaninus in British Columbia. Certain portions of the line are of steep gradients, requiring that the trains should be worked with powerful engines and powerful brakes."	Lord Macnaghten; Lord Atkinson; **Lord Shaw**; Lord Mersey; Sir Henri Elzéar Taschereau	Appeal allowed	Full Court of the Supreme Court of British Columbia
James T. Burchell v. The Gowrie and Blackhouse Collieries Limited	[1910] UKPC 43	"This is an Appeal by special leave from a Judgment of Supreme Court of Canada, dated the 5th day of October 1909. By that Judgment the Supreme Court affirmed by a majority a Judgment of the Supreme Court of Nova Scotia in banco, dated the 23rd day of January 1909, which by a majority reversed a Judgment of the Official Referee dated the 6th day of April 1908, to whom the case had been referred by an Order of the Supreme Court of Nova Scotia made on consent."	Lord Macnaghten; **Lord Atkinson**; Lord Shaw; Lord Mersey	Appeal allowed	Supreme Court of Canada
The Attorney General for the Province of Quebec v. The Attorney General for the Province of Ontario	[1910] UKPC 44	"The question in this case arises under an arbitration between the Dominion of Canada, the Province of Ontario, and the Province of Quebec, pursuant to the statute of Canada, 54 & 55 Vict., cap. 6, the statute of Ontario, 54 Vict., cap. 2, and the statute of Quebec, 54 Vict., cap. 4. These three statutes are in the same terms and provide that questions arising on the settlement of accounts between the Dominion and the two Provinces named may be referred to arbitration for final determination."	Lord Macnaghten; Lord Atkinson; **Lord Shaw**; Lord Mersey	Appeal allowed	Supreme Court of Canada
The Western Electric Company v. Francis Xavier Plaunt; and Francis Xavier Plaunt v. The Western Electric Company	[1910] UKPC 45	"The action that has given rise to this Appeal was referred for trial to the Local Master of the High Court of Justice at Ottawa. The Master duly made his Report. The Report was approved and confirmed by Latchford, J. The Judgment of that learned Judge was affirmed by the Court of Appeal for Ontario."	**Lord Macnaghten**; Lord Atkinson; Lord Shaw; Lord Mersey	Appeal dismissed	Court of Appeal for Ontario
William J. White and Another v. Samuel Simpson Sharpe	[1910] UKPC 46	"This is an Action to enforce specific performance of an Agreement dated the 23rd May 1907 for the sale of shares in a mining company. The Agreement states certain representations as the basis of the contract; it sets them out in detail. On the 1st June 1907, after a visit to the property in company with the Plaintiff, and a refusal by the Plaintiff to extend the time for payment, the Defendant W.J. White telegraphed to the Plaintiff as follows:– "Representations made by you found not to be true. Contract cancelled." The Defendant was asked by telegram and letters to state in what respect the representations were not true. He made no answer. Sharpe, the Plaintiff, then brought this Action for specific performance. The defence was a charge of fraud and nothing else. On that issue the parties went to trial. The learned Judge, after seeing and hearing the witnesses, made a decree for specific performance."	**Lord Macnaghten**; Lord Atkinson; Lord Shaw; Lord Mersey	Appeal dismissed	Court of Appeal for Ontario
The Standard Ideal Company v. The Standard Sanitary Manufacturing Company	[1910] UKPC 47	"This is an Appeal from a Judgement of the Court of the King's Bench (Appeal Side), for the Province of Quebec confirming with a slight variation a Judgment of the Superior Court of that Province. The Judgment so varied restrains the Standard Ideal Company, the Defendant in the action, "from using the word 'Standard' in connection with enamelled bath tubs, washstands, lavatories, sinks, laundry trays, and other articles of toilet use, and their attachments, either by stamping upon said goods or by circulars, or advertising or otherwise in designating or describing the said particular kind of wares, and from representing to the public that goods, wares, or merchandise manufactured or sold by the said Defendant are the goods, wares, or merchandise of the Plaintiff." "	**Lord Macnaghten**; Lord Atkinson; Lord Shaw; Lord Mersey	Appeal allowed	Quebec Court of King's Bench (Appeal Side)
The Burrard Power Company Limited and another v. The King	[1910] UKPC 48	"This is an appeal, by special leave, from the judgment of the Supreme Court of Canada, affirming a judgment of the Exchequer Court of Canada rendered on the 10th May 1909. The only question raised upon the appeal is whether certain water rights in the Railway Belt of British Columbia are vested in the Dominion Government so as to preclude the Provincial Legislature from dealing with them."	Lord Macnaghten; Lord Atkinson; Lord Shaw; **Lord Mersey**	Appeal dismissed	Supreme Court of Canada
W.J. McFarland v. The Bank of Montreal and The Royal Trust Company	[1910] UKPC 49	"In this case the Appellant, who was a shareholder in the Ontario Bank (now in liquidation), having been placed on the list of contributories calls upon the liquidator to dispute the accounts of the Bank of Montreal, claiming to be a creditor, and in fact the only creditor of the Ontario Bank."	**Lord Macnaghten**; Lord Atkinson; Lord Shaw; Lord Mersey	Appeal dismissed	Ontario Court of Appeal
The Bank of Montreal v. Jane Jacques Stuart and another	[1910] UKPC 53	"The action which has given rise to this Appeal was brought by Mrs. Stuart, a married lady living with her husband the Respondent John Stuart, against the Bank of Montreal with the object of setting aside a series of transaction in connection with a pulp and paper company, known as the Maritime Sulphite Fibre Company, Limited, in which she became involved at the instance of her husband for his accommodation and for the accommodation and benefit of his associates."	**Lord Macnaghten**; Lord Collins; Lord Shaw; Sir Arthur Wilson	Appeal dismissed	Supreme Court of Canada
The Erie County Natural Gas and Fuel Company, Limited, and others, v. Samuel S. Carroll and another; and Samuel S. Carrol and another v. The Erie County Natural Gas and Fuel Company. Limited, and others	[1910] UKPC 57	"In this case both the parties in an action in which Samuel S. Carroll and William E. Carroll were Plaintiffs and The Erie County Natural Gas and Fuel Company, Limited, and The Provincial Natural Gas and Fuel Company Limited, were Defendants, have lodged Appeals against a judgment of the Court of Appeal of Ontario, dated the 5th of April 1909, whereby the Appeal of the Defendants against a judgment of the High Court of Justice of Ontario, dated the 9th of December 1907, delivered by Mr. Justice Britton, was dismissed, and this latter judgment was affirmed."	Lord Macnaghten; **Lord Atkinson**; Lord Shaw; Lord Mersey	Appeal allowed	Court of Appeal for Ontario
The Minister of Public Works of the Province of Alberta v. The Canadian Pacific Railway Company; The King v. The Canadian Pacific Railway Company	[1911] UKPC 5; [1911] UKPC 6	"The two actions which have given rise to these Appeals were brought to enforce two separate claims by or on behalf of the Province of Alberta to tax certain lands belonging to the Canadian Pacific Railway Company. The lands in questions formed part of the land subsidy earned by the Railway Company in the construction of their railway. In 1881, when the Construction Contract was approved and ratified by an Act of the Dominion Parliament (44 Vict. cap. 1), the district in which the lands are situated was part of the region known as 'the North-West Territories.' "	**Lord Macnaghten**; Lord Atkinson; Lord Shaw; Lord Mersey; Lord Robson	Appeal dismissed	Supreme Court of Alberta
The American Asbestos Company v. The Johnsons Company	[1911] UKPC 18	"This is an Appeal by the Plaintiffs in the action from a Judgment of the Superior Court of Quebec sitting in review, which affirmed a Judgment of Mr. Justice Hutchinson dismissing the action with costs. The Appellants and respondents are owners of adjacent plots of land numbered 31 (containing about 124 acres) and 32 (containing 123 acres) bordering on St. Francis Road, in the Township of Coleraine, in the County of Megantic and Province of Quebec, which have been found to contain valuable deposits of asbestos. The dispute between the parties is as to the proper boundary line between the said plots."	Lord Macnaghten; Lord Mersey; **Lord Robson**; Sir Arthur Wilson	Appeal dismissed	Superior Court of Quebec
The Grand Trunk Railway Company of Canada v. Walter C. Barnett	[1911] UKPC 20	"This is an Appeal from a Judgment of the Court of Appeal for Ontario (Meredith, J.A., dissenting) affirming the Judgment of a Divisional Court of the High Court of Justice, which reversed the Judgment of Meredith, C.J., delivered in favour of the Appellants on the findings of the Jury. The Respondent was Plaintiff in the action, and sued for damages for personal injuries cause by the negligence of the Defendant Railway Company's servants."	Lord Macnaghten; **Lord Robson**; Sir Arthur Wilson	Appeal allowed	Ontario Court of Appeal
The Canadian Pacific Railway Company v. The Corporation of the City of Toronto and the Grand Trunk Railway Company of Canada	[1911] UKPC 30	"At the close of the argument of these Consolidated Appeals, their Lordships intimated that they would humbly advise His Majesty that they should be dismissed. They will now give their reasons for the decision at which they arrived. The first is an Appeal from a Judgment of the Court of Appeal of Ontario, dated the 17th of September 1907, confirming a Judgment of Mr. Justice Anglin; and the second is an Appeal from a Judgment of the Supreme Court of Canada, dated the 15th of February 1910. By the first of these Judgments a certain order of the Railway Committee of the Privy Council of Canada dated the 14th of January 1904, and purporting to be made under the 238th section of the Canadian Railway Act, 1906, whereby the two railway companies, the Canadian Pacific Railway Company and the Grand Trunk Railway Company of Canada were ordered to carry a bridge over their respective lines at Yonge Street in the City of Toronto, called the Yonge Street Bridge, was held to be intra vires and valid, and by the second an order dated the 9th of June 1909, of a certain body called the Railway Board, created by a statute, styled in the Case of the Appellants 'the Viaduct Order,' whereby the two Companies were ordered amongst other things, to construct an elevated viaduct some miles in length for the purpose of carrying two of the tracks of each of their respective lines through the said city, was also held to be intra vires and valid."	Lord Loreburn, Lord Chancellor; Lord Macnaghten; **Lord Atkinson**; Lord Shaw; Lord Robson	Appeal dismissed	Supreme Court of Canada; Court of Appeal for Ontario
Robert Gilmour Leckie and others v. William Marshall and others	[1911] UKPC 33	"This is an Appeal from a decision of the Court of Appeal for Ontario, dated the 15th June 1910, on appeal from a decision of MacMahon, J., of the 26th November 1909. The learned Judges of the Appeal Court were in the result equally divided in opinion, and consequently the decision of MacMahon, J., was affirmed."	Lord Macnaghten; Lord Robson; **Sir Arthur Wilson**	Appeal dismissed	Court of Appeal for Ontario
The Attorney General for the Dominion of Canada v. The Standard Trust Company of New York	[1911] UKPC 37	"In this Appeal the question which has to be decided is whether the Appellant, the Attorney-General for the Dominion of Canada, can successfully object to a claim by the Respondents to be admitted as creditors of the South Shore Railway Company for a sum of 348,000 dollars."	**Viscount Haldane**; Lord Macnaghten; Lord Mersey; Lord Robson	Appeal dismissed	Supreme Court of Canada
Martha Suzanna Wyatt and others v. The Attorney General of the Province of Quebec]	[1911] UKPC 39	"This is an Appeal from the unanimous judgment of the Supreme Court of Canada reversing a judgment of the Court of King's Bench in Quebec and restoring that of the Superior Court. The question relates to the right of fishing in a stretch of the river Moisie, some six miles long, lying below the first rapids met with in going up the river."	**Lord Macnaghten**; Lord Mersey; Lord Robson; Sir Arthur Wilson	Appeal dismissed	Supreme Court of Canada
Louis A. Lapointe and others v. Henri Larin	[1911] UKPC 46	"This is an Appeal from the Supreme Court of Canada. The question at issue lies in a very narrow compass, but it has given rise to a singular divergence of judicial opinion. The trial Judge dismissed the Plaintiff's action with costs. The Court of Review by a majority of two Judges to one reversed the decision of the trial Judge and gave judgment for the Plaintiff. The Court of Appeal for Quebec, consisting of five Judges, unanimously overruled the Court of Review and restored the judgment of the trial Judge. And lastly, the Supreme Court, by a majority of three to two, reversed the judgment of the Court of Appeal and restored the judgment of the Court of Review. The result is that the Defendants, who constituted the Finance Committee of the Montreal City Council, have been deprived of office, condemned jointly and severally to pay the sum of $3,809.40., and disqualified for re-election as aldermen for the period of two years."	Viscount Haldane; **Lord Macnaghten**; Lord Mersey; Lord Robson	Appeal allowed	Supreme Court of Canada
The Attorney-General for the Dominion of Canada v. Fedorenko	[1911] UKPC 53	"The only question in this Appeal is whether the absence of a requisition by the Russian Government for extradition vitiated the proceedings under which this accused was arrested and committed for surrender?"	**Earl Loreburn, Lord Chancellor**; Viscount Haldane; Lord Macnaghten; Lord Shaw; Lord De Villiers, CJSA; Lord Robson	Appeal allowed	Manitoba Court of Queen's Bench
The City of Vancouver v. The Vancouver Lumber Company and Another	[1911] UKPC 57	"This is an Appeal from a Judgment of the Court of Appeal of British Columbia, dated the 1st November 1910, reversing the Judgment of the Hon. Mr. Justice Morrison, dated the 31st January 1910. The writ, which was issued on the 7th June 1909, claimed possession of an island known as Deadman's Island, situate in Coal Harbour in Burrow Inlet, City of Vancouver."	Lord Macnaghten; Lord Shaw; **Lord Mersey**; Lord De Villiers, CJSA; Lord Robson	Appeal dismissed	Court of Appeal of British Columbia
The Haddington Island Quarry Company, Limited v. Alden Wesley Huson and others	[1911] UKPC 60	"This is an Appeal against a Judgment of the Court of Appeal of British Columbia reversing a Judgment of Morrison, J., in the Supreme Court which dismissed the Plaintiffs' action with costs. The Plaintiffs were the mortgagors and personal representatives of mortgagors of a certain Quarry known as Haddington Island, and the Defendants were the assignees of the mortgage and purchasers of the Quarry, the sale to the latter having been effected by virtue of a power of sale conferred on the mortgagees by the indenture of mortgage."	Lord Macnaghten; Lord Shaw; Lord Mersey; **Lord De Villiers, CJSA**; Lord Robson	Appeal allowed	Court of Appeal of British Columbia
The Canadian Northern Railway Company v. Thomas D. Robinson and another	[1911] UKPC 62	"This is an Appeal from a Judgment of the Supreme Court of Canada, which, by a majority of three to two, dismissed an Appeal from an Order of the Court of Appeal for Manitoba. This Order dismissed the Appeal of the Appellants against a Judgment of Mr. Justice Metcalfe awarding damages to the Respondents for the neglect and failure of the Appellants between 31st October 1904 and 28th September 1906 to supply proper facilities for receiving, forwarding, and delivery of traffic upon the railway of the Appellants."	**Viscount Haldane**; Lord Macnaghten; Lord Shaw; Lord De Villiers, CJSA; Lord Robson	Appeal dismissed	Supreme Court of Canada
The Grand Trunk Pacific Railway Company v. The King	[1911] UKPC 65	"This is an Appeal from a judgment of the Supreme Court of Canada on a Reference by the Governor-General in Council asking a series of questions touching the meaning and effect of a provision contained in a supplementary agreement between the Government and the Grand Trunk Pacific Railway Company, which modified the original Contract between that Company and the Government."	Viscount Haldane; **Lord Macnaghten**; Lord Shaw; Lord Robson	Appeal allowed	Supreme Court of Canada
The Grand Trunk Pacific Railway Company v. The Landowners fronting on Empire Avenue and McKellar or Hardisty Street, Fort William, and others	[1911] UKPC 66	"This is an Appeal from a Judgment of the Supreme Court of Canada dated the 15th June 1910. That Judgment dismissed an Appeal from an Order of the Board of Railway Commissioners for Canada, which Order was made on the 6th October 1909. The facts giving rise to the question before their Lordships may be stated in a word. The Grand Trunk Pacific Railway Company constructed a branch line to the town of Fort William in the Province of Ontario, and in order to "establish and maintain its terminals and other works in connection therewith", it entered into an agreement with the Corporation of that town on the 29th March 1905."	Lord Atkinson; **Lord Shaw**; Lord Mersey; Lord Robson	Appeal allowed	Supreme Court of Canada
The King v. Irvine A. Lovitt and others	[1911] UKPC 67	"This is an Appeal from a Judgment of the Supreme Court of Canada reversing a Judgment of the Supreme Court of New Brunswick. The question at issue is whether the Defendants, who are the executors of the will of George H. Lovitt deceased, are liable to pay succession duty in respect of money which the testator had placed on special deposit in the St. John's [sic] (New Brunswick) Branch of the Bank of British North America."	Viscount Haldane; Lord Macnaghten; Lord Shaw; **Lord Robson**	Appeal allowed	Supreme Court of Canada
The City of Montreal v. The Montreal Street Railway Company (Respondents) and The Attorney-General for the Dominion of Canada and The Attorney-General for the Province of Quebec (Intervenants)	[1912] UKPC 5	"This is an Appeal by special leave from a judgment of the Supreme Court of Canada pronounced upon the 11th of March 1910, whereby an Appeal from a certain Order of the Board of Railway Commissioners for Canada, dated the 4th of May 1909, was allowed, the said Order set aside, and it was declared that the said Commissioners had no jurisdiction to make the Order appealed from."	Earl Loreburn, Lord Chancellor; Lord Macnaghten; **Lord Atkinson**; Lord Shaw; Lord Robson	Appeal dismissed	Supreme Court of Canada
The National Trust Company, Limited, v. Louis E. Whicher	[1912] UKPC 13	"This action was brought by the Respondent as a bondholder in the Dominion Copper Company, a corporation constituted under the laws of British Columbia, against the Appellants who are a trust company and were trustees for the bondholders of the Copper Company under a mortgage deed of the 1st June 1905."	Earl Loreburn, Lord Chancellor; Lord Macnaghten; Lord Atkinson; **Lord Robson**	Appeal allowed	Court of Appeal for Ontario
The Winnipeg Electric Railway Company v. The City of Winnipeg; The City of Winnipeg v. The Winnipeg Electric Railway Company	[1912] UKPC 14 [1912] UKPC 15	"The Appellants are the successors, by amalgamation, purchase, or agreement, of certain Companies hereinafter referred to, the general object of whose constitution was for the supply of light, heat, and power in and about the City of Winnipeg by gas or by electricity."	Earl Loreburn, Lord Chancellor; Lord Macnaghten; Lord Atkinson; **Lord Shaw**; Lord Robson	Appeal allowed	Court of Appeal of Manitoba
Moreton Frewen v. Charles M. Hays and others	[1912] UKPC 28	"In the action which has given rise to this Appeal, the Appellant, Moreton Frewen, as Plaintiff, claimed specific performance of an agreement made between himself and the Respondents The Grand Truck Pacific Town and Development Company, Limited, called for sake of brevity the Town Site Company."	**Lord Macnaghten**; Lord Atkinson; Lord Shaw; Lord Robson	Appeal dismissed	Court of Appeal of British Columbia
The Attorney-General for the Province of Ontario and others v. The Attorney-General for the Dominion of Canada and another	[1912] UKPC 35	"The real point raised in this most important case is whether or not an Act of the Dominion Parliament authorising questions either of law or of fact to be put to the Supreme Court and requiring the Judges of that Court to answer them on the request of the Governor in Council is a valid enactment within the powers of that Parliament."	**Earl Loreburn, Lord Chancellor**; Lord Macnaghten; Lord Atkinson; Lord Shaw; Lord Robson	Appeal dismissed	Supreme Court of Canada
The Dominion Cotton Mills Company, Limited, and others, v. George E. Amyot and others (Respondent) and Alfred Brunet (Intervening)	[1912] UKPC 39	"At the conclusion of the argument in this case it was intimated that their Lordships would humbly advise His Majesty that the appeal should be allowed and the action dismissed with costs both here and below to be paid by the Respondents, and that the Intervenant should bear his own costs. An order to that effect has been made and it only remains for their Lordships to state briefly their reasons for the advice so tendered to His Majesty."	Earl Loreburn, Lord Chancellor; **Lord Macnaghten**; Lord Atkinson; Lord Shaw; Lord Robson	Appeal dismissed	Superior Court of Quebec
Mike Kruz v. The Crow's Nest Pass Coal Company Limited	[1912] UKPC 45	"This is an Appeal from a Judgment of the Court of Appeal for British Columbia dated the 28th day of April 1911 reversing a Judgment of Mr. Justice Clement upon a case stated by an Arbitrator under the provisions of the British Columbia Workmen's Compensation Act, 1902."	Lord Macnaghten; **Lord Atkinson**; Lord Shaw	Appeal allowed	Court of Appeal for British Columbia
Richard J. Kirby v. John J. Cowderoy	[1912] UKPC 46	"This Action was commenced on the 8th April 1910, by a writ of summons in the Supreme Court of British Columbia, by the Respondent, who is the Plaintiff, against the Appellant, the Defendant. The action is for the redemption of certain land situated in the district of New Westminster."	Lord Macnaghten; Lord Atkinson; **Lord Shaw**	Appeal allowed	Court of Appeal of British Columbia
Edward F. Swift and others v. Lester W. David	[1912] UKPC 47	"This is an appeal from a Judgment of the Court of Appeal of British Columbia, dated the 6th of June 1911, reversing a Judgment of Mr. Justice Clement, dated the 29th of September 1910, awarding $171,500 damages and costs to the Appellants, and dismissing their cross appeal against so much of the said Judgment as directed that a deduction of $20,000 should be made from the sum claimed by the Appellants."	Lord Macnaghten; **Lord Atkinson**; Lord Shaw	Appeal dismissed	Court of Appal of British Columbia
Angus Corinthe and others v. The Ecclesiastics of the Seminary of St. Sulpice of Montreal	[1912] UKPC 57	"For upwards of a century a controversy has existed concerning the title to the Seigniory of the Lake of Two Mountains. The Ecclesiastics of the Seminary of St. Sulpice of Montreal, on the one hand, have claimed it under grants from the King of France, and under Statutes passed later on by the Canadian Legislature. Their assertion has been that they hold the Seigniory in the full proprietary title, and that the Indians residing within the limits of the Seigniory have no individual title to it, nor any right, competent to them as individual beneficiaries, to control the administration of the land."	**Viscount Haldane, Lord Chancellor**; Lord Macnaghten; Lord Atkinson; Lord Shaw; Sir Charles Fitzpatrick, CJC	Appeal dismissed	Quebec Court of King's Bench (Appeal Side)
The Attorney-General for the Province of Ontario and others v. The Canadian Niagara Power Company	[1912] UKPC 60	"The question in this case lies in a narrow compass. But it is one of considerable difficulty. The trial Judge, Riddell, J., decided the question in favour of the Respondents. The four learned Judges who constituted the Court of Appeal for Ontario were equally divided in opinion. Moss, C.J., and Garrow, J., were in favour of affirming the decision of the trial Judge. Meredith and Magee, JJ. were in favour of reversing that decision. And so the judgment of the Trial Judge with a slight variation was upheld."	Viscount Haldane, Lord Chancellor; **Lord Macnaghten**; Lord Atkinson; Sir Charles Fitzpatrick, CJC	Appeal allowed	Court of Appeal for Ontario
The Toronto and Niagara Power Company v. The Corporation of the Town of North Toronto	[1912] UKPC 61	"The question raised by this Appeal is whether the Appellants may enter upon the streets of the town of North Toronto for the purpose of erecting poles to carry power lines for the conveyance of electricity. Chancellor Boyd, the Trial Judge, decided that they had such power, but subject to compliance with certain conditions."	**Viscount Haldane, Lord Chancellor**; Lord Macnaghten; Lord Dunedin; Lord Atkinson; Sir Charles Fitzpatrick, CJC	Appeal allowed	Court of Appeal for Ontario
The King v. The Alberta Railway and Irrigation Company	[1912] UKPC 62	"This is an Appeal from an Order of the Supreme Court of Canada reversing by a majority of three learned Judges to two the unanimous Supreme Court of Alberta, which affirmed the judgment of the judgment of the Trial Judge. The question is whether the Provincial Government or the Respondents, the Irrigation Company, who were Defendants in the action are bound to construct the necessary bridges at the points where the Company's canals intersect the road allowance reserved throughout the Province of Alberta under the Dominion Lands Act, R.S.C. 1886, c. 54."	Viscount Haldane, Lord Chancellor; **Lord Macnaghten**; Lord Dunedin; Lord Atkinson	Appeal allowed	Supreme Court of Canada
In the Matter of a Reference to the Supreme Court of Canada pursuant to Section 60 of the Supreme Court Act of certain questions concerning Marriage for hearing and consideration	[1912] UKPC 63	"The questions to be decided arise on an Appeal, for which special leave was given, from the answers returned by the Supreme Court of Canada to certain questions submitted by the Government of Canada pursuant to Section 60 of the Supreme Court Act."	Viscount Haldane, Lord Chancellor; The Earl of Halsbury; Lord Macnaghten; Lord Atkinson; Lord Shaw; **Lord Chief Baron Palles**	Appeal dismissed	Supreme Court of Canada
Charles W. Stapleton v. The American Asbestos Company, Limited	[1912] UKPC 64	"This is an Appeal into which, by Order of the Court of King's Bench (Appeal Side) for the Province of Quebec, three Appeals from three judgments of that Court, each dated 22 March 1911, were consolidated for the purpose of appeal to His Majesty in Council. The action out of which these Appeals arose was instituted by Charles W. Stapleton, the Appellant, to recover the sum of $18,000 balance of a sum of $23,000 commission at the rate of 10 per cent on a sum $230,000, the alleged purchase money of certain mining property situate at or near the town of Black Lake in the Province of Quebec, purchased by the Respondent Company from three other companies having interest in them, namely, The United Asbestos Company, The Glasgow and Montreal Asbestos Company and The Manhattan Asbestos Company."	Lord Macnaghten; **Lord Atkinson**; Sir Charles Fitzpatrick, CJC	Appeal dismissed	Quebec Court of King's Bench (Appeal Side)
The Barnard-Argue-Roth-Sterns Oil and Gas Company, Limited, and others v. Alexander Farquharson	[1912] UKPC 67	"This is an Appeal from a Judgment of the Ontario Court of Appeal, dated the 20th November 1911, affirming the Judgment of the Chancellor of Ontario and dismissing the Appeal of the Appellants. The Canada Company, the principal Appellant, the other Appellants being merely its licensees, was incorporated by a Charter of King George the IVth, dated the 19th of August 1826, granted in exercise of the powers vested in His Majesty by a Statute of the Imperial Parliament passed in the sixth year of his reign, entitled 'An Act to enable His Majesty to grant to a Company to be incorporated by Charter to be called The Canada Company certain lands in the Province of Upper Canada, and to invest the Company with certain powers and privileges and for other purposes.' "	Viscount Haldane, Lord Chancellor; Lord Macnaghten; **Lord Atkinson**; Sir Charles Fitzpatrick, CJC	Appeal dismissed	Court of Appeal for Ontario
Charles Langelier v. Philippe Angers	[1912] UKPC 68	"This is an Appeal against the Judgment of the Court of King's Bench for the Province of Quebec (Appeal Side) given on the 8th October 1910. The Court of King's Bench reversed a Judgment of the Superior Court for Quebec, of date the 25th January 1910. There is not a little confusion in regard to transactions and attempts at transactions, mostly abortive and all of highly speculative character, between the persons mentioned as involved therein on the Record. Their Lordships express no surprise at the difficulties which confronted the Canadian Courts in attempting to unravel or to bring within any known legal category the rights of the parties in the case."	Viscount Haldane, Lord Chancellor; Lord Macnaghten; Lord Atkinson; **Lord Shaw**	Appeal allowed	Quebec Court of King's Bench (Appeal Side)
William H. Parsons and others v. The Sovereign Bank of Canada	[1912] UKPC 70	"The Appellants are paper merchants, and the Respondents are bankers. The Imperial Paper Mills Company was incorporated under Ontario law in 1903. It has carried on the business of paper manufacture at Sturgeon Falls in Ontario, and has had numerous business contracts with the Appellants from a date prior to 27th October 1906. A Receiver and Manager of the Paper Mills Company was the appointed by the Court in a debenture-holders' Action, but the business relations with the Appellants continued."	**Viscount Haldane, Lord Chancellor**; Lord Macnaghten; Lord Atkinson; Lord Shaw	Appeal allowed	Court of Appeal for Ontario
Minnie Ann McKenzie and others v. The Corporation of the Township or District of Chilliwack	[1912] UKPC 71	"The Appellants brought an action in the Supreme Court of British Columbia, under Lord Campbell's Act, claiming damages for the death of Daniel McKenzie. They were the widow, son, and daughter of the deceased. His death was caused by a fire which burnt down a cell which was used as a "lock-up" for the rural Municipality of Chilliwack. The deceased had been placed in this cell by a constable after arrest."	Viscount Haldane, Lord Chancellor; Lord Atkinson; Lord Shaw; **Sir Samuel Evans, President of the Probate, Divorce and Admiralty Division**	Appeal dismissed	Court of Appeal for British Columbia
The Town of Outremont v. Alfred Joyce	[1912] UKPC 72	"This is an Appeal by special leave from a judgment of the Court of King's Bench (Appeal Side) for the Province of Quebec, dated the 23rd of March 1910, confirming a judgment of the Superior Court of the said Province dated the 12th October 1909. By this latter judgment the claim of the Appellants to recover from the Respondent a sum of $1,132.53 with interest at 4 ½ per cent. per annum was dismissed."	Viscount Haldane, Lord Chancellor; **Lord Atkinson**; Lord Shaw; Sir Samuel Evans, President of the Probate, Divorce, and Admiralty Division	Appeal dismissed	Quebec Court of King's Bench (Appeal Side)
George A. Pearson v. Thomas R. O'Brien and another	[1912] UKPC 81	"In the month of May 1910 the Respondent Thomas Douglas was, or purported to be, owner of a house and premises in Colony Street in the city of Winnipeg, described on a certain plan as lot 26, and S. ½ S. of lots 23, 25, and 85, St. James."	Viscount Haldane, Lord Chancellor; The Earl of Halsbury; Lord Macnaghten; **Lord Atkinson**; Lord Shaw	Appeal dismissed	Court of Appeal for Manitoba
Allan McPherson and another v. The Temiskaming Lumber Company, Limited	[1912] UKPC 86	"This Appeal arises out of Interpleader issues. As put in the question for trial, the issue was whether certain goods and chattels consisting of saw-logs seized in execution by the Sheriff of the District of Nipissing, in the Province of Ontario, under the writs of fieri facias after mentioned, 'for the having in execution of the judgment' upon which the writs were issued, 'were at the time of the seizure by the said Sheriff exigible under the said executions of the said execution creditors as against the said claimants The Temiskaming Lumber Company, Limited'."	The Earl of Halsbury; Lord Macnaghten; Lord Atkinson; **Lord Shaw**; Sir Charles Fitzpatrick, CJC	Appeal allowed	Court of Appeal for Ontario
J. Kerr Wilson v. The Corporation of Delta	[1912] UKPC 104	"This is an Appeal from a judgment of the Court of Appeal of British Columbia dismissing an appeal from the judgment of Hunter, C.J., upon a counter-claim by the Appellant in an action brought against him by the Respondents. The Appellant is a landowner at Delta, New Westminster, in the Province of British Columbia, and the Respondents are the Municipal Corporation of that place."	Lord Macnaghten; Lord Mersey; **Lord Moulton**	Appeal dismissed	Court of Appeal of British Columbia
Michael Kelly and another v. Thomas Kelly	[1912] UKPC 105	"On the 13th of December 1909 Macdonald J. made a decree for the dissolution of the partnership of Kelly Brothers & Co. builders, contractors, and brick manufacturers as from the 1st of April 1909. The partners in the firm were the Plaintiffs Michael and Martin Kelly and their brother Thomas Kelly, who was Defendant in the Action."	**Lord Macnaghten**; Lord Atkinson; Lord Moulton	Appeal allowed	Court of Appeal for MAnitoba
Michael Kelly and another v. C. H. Enderton and others	[1912] UKPC 106	"The Appellants in this case, Messrs. Kelly, were proprietors of some ground in the City of Winnipeg. They were approached by a person of the name of Russell, one of the Defendants to the action, with a view to procuring an option of the purchase of the property. Russell at first made a proposal for an option in favour of a person called Bell on certain terms."	Viscount Haldane, Lord Chancellor; **Lord Dunedin**; Lord Atkinson; Lord Moulton	Appeal dismissed	Court of Appeal for Manitoba
Royal Bank of Canada v. The King	[1913] UKPC 1a	"This is an Appeal from a Judgement of the Supreme Court of Alberta. It raises questions of much importance, which their Lordships have taken time to consider. The main controversy is as to the validity of a Statute of the Legislature of Alberta passed in 1910, and dealing with the proceeds of sale of certain bonds. These proceeds had been deposited with certain Banks, one of them being the Appellant Bank. The judgment under appeal was given in an action brought by the Government of Alberta against the Royal Bank of Canada, the Alberta and Great Waterways Railway Company, and the Canada West Construction Company, to recover $6,042,083.26, with interest, being the amount of the deposit held by the Appellant Bank."	**Viscount Haldane, Lord Chancellor**; Lord Macnaghten; Lord Atkinson; Lord Moulton	Appeal allowed	Supreme Court of Alberta
Felix A. McHugh, since deceased (now represented by Felix Alexander Joseph McHugh and others) v The Union Bank of Canada; and Thomas P. McHugh, since deceased (now represented by Felix Alexander Joseph McHugh and another)	[1913] UKPC 5	"These are consolidated Appeals in two cases in which Felix A. McHugh and Thomas P. McHugh were respectively the Plaintiffs and The Union Bank of Canada was the Defendant. They are brought by Special Leave from judgments of the Supreme Court of Canada in the two cases dated the 15th of May 1911. The original Plaintiffs, Felix A. McHugh and Thomas P. McHugh, have died during the pendency of the actions, and the present Appellants are in each case the personal representatives of the original Plaintiffs."	Viscount Haldane, Lord Chancellor; Lord Macnaghten; Lord Atkinson; **Lord Moulton**	Appeal allowed	Supreme Court of Canada
Charles Robertson Gordon v. Williams Sowden Holland	[1913] UKPC 7	"These are consolidated Appeals brought by Charles Robertson Gordon and William Sowden Holland, respectively, from a judgment of the Court of Appeal of British Columbia, dated the 2nd of April 1912, whereby the judgment of the learned Trial Judge, Mr. Justice Gregory, in favour of the Plaintiff Charles Robertson Gordon dated the 19th of September 1911, was varied in some respects."	Viscount Haldane, Lord Chancellor; Lord Dunedin; **Lord Atkinson**; Lord Moulton	Appeal allowed	Court of Appeal of British Columbia
John H. Kilmer v. The British Columbia Orchard Lands, Limited	[1913] UKPC 10	"The question on this Appeal arises out of a claim by the Respondent Company—an unpaid vendor of a tract of undeveloped land in British Columbia—to enforce a condition of forfeiture contained in the agreement for sale. By the terms of the agreement the purchase-money was to be paid together with interest by specified instalments at certain specified dates. Time was declared to be of the essence of the agreement."	Lord Macnaghten; Lord Atkinson; Lord Moulton	Appeal allowed	Court of Appeal of British Columbia
The Grand Trunk Railway Company of Canada v. William H. McAlpine, since deceased, and others	[1913] UKPC 33	"This is an Appeal from a Judgment dated the 25th November 1911, of the Court of King's Bench for the Province of Quebec (Appeal side), whereby a Judgment, dated the 11th October 1910, of Mr. Justice Demers in favour of William H. McAlpine, deceased, for a sum of $6,500 and costs was affirmed. This sum was the amount of the damages awarded to McAlpine by the verdict of the Jury in an action instituted by him against the Appellants in respect of injuries he sustained by being knocked and injured by one of their locomotive engines."	Viscount Haldane, Lord Chancellor; Lord Dunedin; **Lord Atkinson**; Lord Moulton	Appeal allowed	Quebec Court of King's Bench (Appeal Side)
The British Columbia Electric Railway Company Limited v. W.F. Stewart and others	[1913] UKPC 36	"These are Appeals by special leave from two Orders of the Court of Appeal of British Columbia, dated the 29th of November 1911 and the 15th of December 1911 respectively. By the first of these Orders leave was refused to the British Columbia Electric Railway Company, Limited, styled in the case the Appellant Company, to be added as parties in an Appeal then pending in the Court of Appeal in which four electors of the Municipality of Point Grey in British Columbia were Appellants, and the Corporation of Point Grey were Respondents, and to intervene and prosecute the same."	Viscount Haldane, Lord Chancellor; Lord Dunedin; **Lord Atkinson**; Lord Shaw; Lord Moulton	Appeal allowed	Court of Appeal of British Columbia
Donald McMillan and another v. W.E. Stewart and others	[1913] UKPC 37	"Their Lordships have carefully considered the Judgment appealed from, and they have not heard anything in the argument which have been addressed to them to induce them to think that it is erroneous in any respect. Accordingly, they adopt it, as they think it deals satisfactorily with the questions in dispute."	**Lord Atkinson**; Lord Shaw; Lord Moulton	Appeal dismissed	Ontario Court of Appeal
James Playfair v. The Meaford Elevator Company, Limited; and the Meaford Elevator Company, Limited v. The Montreal Transportation Company, Limited	[1913] UKPC 41	"The Plaintiffs in this case are the proprietors of a dock at the town of Meaford. In connection with the dock and on the quay thereof is a grain elevator which belongs to the Plaintiffs. The elevator is a tower-like structure, from which depends a long tube, commonly called the leg of the elevator, inside which are a travelling set of buckets on an endless chain, worked somewhat in the fashion of buckets in a dredger. The leg can be lifted up and let down and is in practice introduced into the hatch, and then, by an adjustable device in the end of it, kept at the proper level to bail out the grain."	Viscount Haldane, Lord Chancellor; **Lord Dunedin**; Lord Atkinson; Lord Moulton	Appeal allowed	Court of Appeal for Ontario
The Canadian Pacific Railway Company v. The Steamship "Kronprinz Olav"; and the Steamship "Montcalm" v. Johan Bryde	[1913] UKPC 43	"These are appeals from a judgment of the Supreme Court of Canada affirming by a majority the judgment of the Deputy Local Judge in Admiralty at Montreal in two cross-actions for damages by collision."	Present at the Hearing: Lord Atkinson; **Lord Mersey**; Lord Moulton; Lord Parker of Waddington Nautical Assessors: Rear-Admiral Robert N. Ommanney, C.B. Commander W.F. Caborne, C.B., R.N.R.	Appeal allowed in part	Supreme Court of Canada
Mary Jones v. The Canadian Pacific Railway Company, and The Canadian Pacific Railway Company v. Mary Jones	[1913] UKPC 44	"This is an Appeal and Cross-Appeal by special leave from a Judgment of the Court of Appeal for Ontario dated the 18th June 1912, setting aside the verdict of a Jury and the Judgment of the High Court of Justice for Ontario entered on the 24th November 1911, and directing that there should be a new trial of the action or that, in the event of the Plaintiff accepting the sum of $2,000 paid into Court by the Defendants, Judgment be entered for the Plaintiff for that sum."	**Lord Atkinson**; Lord Shaw; Lord Moulton	Appeal allowed	Court of Appeal for Ontario
James H. Kennedy v. David Kennedy and others	[1913] UKPC 45	"The testator David Kennedy by his will dated the 4th June 1903 appointed his son, the present Appellant, Annie Maud Hamilton, and his granddaughter, Gertrude Maud Foxwell (thereinafter called his trustees), to be his executor and executrixes and he devised to the Appellant his dwelling-house and premises therein mentioned, subject nevertheless to the provision thereinafter contained for the benefit of Annie Maud Hamilton and Gertrude Maud Foxwell. By this provision each of these ladies was to be entitled to live in the dwelling-house as her home and to occupy a room therein for her life, and was also to be entitled to all necessary maintenance and board which the testator made a charge on the premises."	Lord Atkinson; Lord Shaw; Lord Moulton; **Lord Parker of Waddington**	Appeal dismissed	Court of Appeal for Ontario
Geoffrey Teignmouth Clarkson and another v. George Wishart and another	[1913] UKPC 46	"This is an Appeal by special leave from the Judgment of the Divisional Court of the High Court of Justice of Ontario dated the 30th August 1912, which affirmed the Judgment of the Mining Commissioner for that Province dated the 16th April 1912. That officer held that the interest of the Respondent Wishart in a mining claim was not exigible under a writ of fieri facias against his lands and goods."	Lord Atkinson; **Lord Shaw**; Lord Moulton	Appeal allowed	Ontario High Court of Justice (Divisional Court)
Douglas C. Cameron v. Thomas Afred Cuddy and another	[1913] UKPC 47	"This is an Action brought by the respondents who were vendors of the shares of a certain lumber company. They sue the Appellant to recover payment of their purchase money. Judgment was obtained for the sum of $83,532. This judgment was pronounced in the Supreme Court of British Columbia, and an Appeal against it was dismissed by the Court of Appeal for that Province. A further Appeal to the Supreme Court of Canada by the Appellant also failed."	Lord Atkinson; **Lord Shaw**; Lord Moulton; Lord Parker of Waddington	Appeal allowed	Supreme Court of Canada
The Imperial Paper Mills of Canada, Limited, and another v. The Quebec Bank and others	[1913] UKPC 48	"This is an Appeal from the Judgment of the Court of Appeal for Ontario dated the 28th June 1912, which affirmed the Judgment of the High Court of Justice for Ontario, dated the 11th August 1911, dismissing the Appellants' Action. In September and November 1903 the Imperial Paper Mills Company executed certain mortgage deeds of trust to secure first and second mortgage bond issues for sums of 100,000l. and 200,00l. respectively. Nearly all the bonds comprised in both issues were at the time of the Action outstanding and unpaid."	Lord Atkinson; **Lord Shaw**; Lord Moulton; Lord Parker of Waddington	Appeal dismissed	Court of Appeal for Ontario
The Monarch Life Assurance Company v. Ewan Mackenzie	[1913] UKPC 49	"This is an Appeal in an action brought in The High Court of Justice of Ontario by Ewan Mackenzie, the present Respondent, against the Appellants, The Monarch Life Assurance Company. In the Statement of Claim the Plaintiff claimed as the holder of twenty-five shares in the Defendant Company, 'represented by Certificate number nineteen issued by the Defendant Company.' "	Lord Atkinson; Lord Shaw; **Lord Moulton**; Lord Parker of Waddington	Appeal allowed	Supreme Court of Canada
The Eastern Construction Company, Limited, v. (1) The National Trust Company, Limited, and others; and (2) Therese Schmidt and others, and The Attorney-General for the Province of Ontario (Intervenant)	[1913] UKPC 50	"The Respondent Company, the National Trust Company, for convenience styled the National Company, brought jointly with John Shilton and William Hollaway Wallbridge, on the 26th June 1909, an action against the Appellant Company, the Eastern Construction Company, William Miller and William Dimmie Dickson, to recover damages for trespassing on their land, cutting down and carrying away certain pine and tamarack trees growing thereon, and injuring the land."	**Lord Atkinson**; Lord Moulton; Lord Parker of Waddington	Appeal allowed	Supreme Court of Canada
Charles S. Cotton and another v. The King; and The King v. Charles S. Cotton and another, from the Supreme Court of Canada	[1913] UKPC 56	"In the principal Appeal now before their Lordships the Appellants are the Executors under the last will and testament of Henry H. Cotton, late of Cowansville in the Province of Quebec. It raises the question whether the moveable property of the Testator situate outside the Province of Quebec is liable to duty under the Quebec Succession Duty Act of 1906."	Viscount Haldane, Lord Chancellor; Lord Atkinson; **Lord Moulton**	Appeal allowed	Supreme Court of Canada
The Toronto and York Radial Railway Company v. The Corporation of the City of Toronto	[1913] UKPC 57	"This is an appeal by leave of the Supreme Court of Ontario from an order of the Appellate Division of that Court dated the 13th day of February 1919, allowing an appeal from an order of the Ontario Railway and Municipal Board pronounced on the 17th day of June 1912 and setting aside such order."	Viscount Haldane, Lord Chancellorr; Lord Shaw; **Lord Moulton**	Appeal dismissed	Court of Appeal for Ontario
The Attorney-General for the Province of British Columbia v. The Attorney-General for the Dominion of Canada and The Attorney-General for the Province of the Ontario and others	[1913] UKPC 63	"This is an Appeal of the Government of British Columbia from answers given by the Supreme Court of Canada to certain questions submitted to it by the Canadian Government, under the authority of a statute of the Dominion Parliament. The questions did not arise in any litigation, but were questions of a general and abstract character relating to the fishery rights of the Province."	**Viscount Haldane, Lord Chancellorr**; Lord Atkinson; Lord Moulton	Appeal dismissed	Supreme Court of Canada
The Canada Law Book Company v. Butterworth and Company and others	[1914] UKPC 1a	"This is an Appeal from a Judgment dated the 25th of April 1913 of the Court of Appeal for the Province of Manitoba, whereby a Judgment of the Court of King's Bench dated the 27th March 1913 delivered by Mr. Justice Metcalfe was overruled. By this latter Judgment an injunction was granted restraining the Defendants, the respondents in the Appeal, from selling or offering for sale, or permitting the sale of, or soliciting orders for, or distributing within the Dominion of Canada and the United States of America, to persons other than the Plaintiffs or their nominees, for a period of five years from the 14th of November 1912, a certain publication or work known as the 'Laws of England', by the Earl of Halsbury; and, as the Respondents admitted at the trial that they had sold the said work in Canada within this period, and that if they were bound by contract with the Plaintiffs not to do so, the latter had thereby suffered some damage it was referred to George Patterson, Esq., K.C., to ascertain the amount of these damages."	Lord Dunedin; **Lord Atkinson**; Lord Shaw	Appeal dismissed	Court of Appeal for Manitoba
David Maclaren and another v. The Attorney General for the Province of Quebec	[1914] UKPC 2	"The Appellants in the present Appeal are David and Alexander Maclaren, the Plaintiffs in the original litigation, and the Respondent is the Attorney-General of the Province of Quebec, who intervened in the suit under circumstances hereinafter mentioned and who, since such intervention, has substantially carried on the litigation on behalf of the government of the Province."	Viscount Haldane, Lord Chancellor; Lord Shaw; **Lord Moulton**	Appeal allowed	Supreme Court of Canada
The Cedars Rapids Manufacturing and Power Company v. Sir Alexandre Lacoste and others	[1914] UKPC 5	"The Appellants are a Company incorporated by a Statute of the Parliament of Canada in 1904, empowered to construct and develop water powers in or adjacent to the River St. Lawrence in the Parish of St. Joseph of Soulanges in the Province of Quebec, and to take by the way of expropriation lands within the Parish actually required for such development."	**Lord Dunedin**; Lord Shaw; Lord Atkinson	Appeal allowed	Superior Court of Quebec
The Ship "St. Pierre-Miquelon" v. The Renwick Steamship Company, Limited and others	[1914] UKPC 11	In this case the owners and the charterers of the steamship Renwick instituted on the 30th of December 1911 an Action in rem against the Defendant, the St. Pierre-Miquelon to recover damages for the loss sustained by them by a collision which admittedly took place between these two ships on the 27th of December 1911 off the coast of Nova Scotia, resulting in the sinking of the Renwick."	**Lord Atkinson**; Lord Moulton; Lord Shaw; Lord Sumner	Appeal dismissed	Supreme Court of Canada
Arthur Allen and others v. John C. Hyatt and other	[1914] UKPC 25	"The appellants were the directors of a Company called the Lakeside Canning Company Limited. The capital of the Company was $750,000 in shares, each of $250. Such shares were issued to the extent of $30,500, and in the year 1909 and for a short time in 1910 these shares were held to the extent of $10,000 by the seven appellants, and to the extent of $20,500 by the twenty-two respondents and certain other person not parties to these proceedings."	**Viscount Haldane, Lord Chancellor**; Lord Moulton; Lord Dunedin; Lord Parker of Waddington; Lord Shaw	Appeal dismissed	Court of Appeal for Ontario
Edward D. Farrell v. The National Trust Company, Limited, and others	[1914] UKPC 27	"Their Lordships have considered the will and various codicils made by the testator. The conclusions at which they have arrived is that it is impossible to attach to the codicil of the 20th March 1909 either of the meanings which are contended for by the appellant."	**Viscount Haldane, Lord Chancellor**; Lord Moulton; Lord Dunedin; Lord Parker of Waddington; Lord Shaw	Appeal dismissed	Court of Appeal for Ontario
John Black and others v. John Carson and others and The Crown Reserve Mining Company	[1914] UKPC 38	"The question raised here is a very short one. A certain set of gentlemen saw their way to acquire a mine. They subscribed between themselves certain sums of money which were sufficient to pay the deposit which was necessary in order to make a tender to the government, and at the same time they entered into an agreement between themselves which provisionally foreshadowed the arrangement which they would make, assuming that their tender was accepted."	**Lord Dunedin**; Lord Parker of Waddington; Lord Moulton; Lord Sumner	Appeal dismissed	Quebec Court of King's Bench (Appeal Side)
William Levine v. Harry Serling	[1914] UKPC 46	"This is an appeal from the judgment of the Supreme Court of Canada, who by a majority of three to two have reversed the unanimous decision of the Court of King's Bench of Quebec. The respondent on 4th November 1908 issued his writ in an action for damages for tort against the appellant, and the appellant duly pleaded that he was a minor, and issue having been joined thereon established the plea."	Viscount Haldane, Lord Chancellor; Lord Parker of Waddington; Lord Dunedin; Lord Sumner; Lord Moulton; **Sir George Farwell**	Appeal allowed	Supreme Court of Canada
Alberto Dini, since deceased (now represented by Dame Malvina Larose) v. Joseph Brunet	[1914] UKPC 47	"The respondent being interested in some stone quarries situate a few miles distant from a portion of the line of the Canadian Pacific Railway Company was anxious to have a branch line constructed to the said quarries. By the Canadian law subsidies are paid by the Federal Government under certain conditions for the construction of railway lines."	**Lord Dunedin**; Lord Parker of Waddington; Lord Moulton; Lord Sumner	Appeal dismissed	Quebec Court of King's Bench (Appeal Side)
Cecil M. Merritt v. Gordon E. Corbould and others	[1914] UKPC 50	"The appellant, the plaintiff in the action, sued for commission due to him as the defendants' agent for procuring a purchaser at their price and on their terms of certain shares in and assets belonging to the Canadian Pacific Lumber Company, Limited, in which the respondents were interested. At the trial he was successful. His evidence was accepted and his claim was allowed. The Court of Appeal of the Province of British Columbia reversed the decision of the Trial Judge, and the plaintiff brings this Appeal by leave of that Court."	Lord Dunedin; Lord Sumner; Lord Moulton; Sir George Farwell; **Lord Parker of Waddington**	Appeal allowed	Court of Appeal of British Columbia
The United Buildings Corporation, Limited v. The City of Vancouver	[1914] UKPC 51	"On 15th July 1912 the Corporation of the City of Vancouver enacted a by-law for the diversion of a lane in that City, which was a public highway. Part of it, which led into one thoroughfare, was stopped up and by giving it a right-angled turn the lane was made to lead into another instead. The Corporation made provision for an extra space for vehicles to turn in at the corner. Whether that space was in fact sufficient, and whether the change itself hampered the preservation of the adjacent buildings in case of fire, are questions which do not arise before this Board. If the Corporation had power to pass the by-law at all, it had authority to determine such questions (Haggerty v. Victoria, 4 B.C.R., at p. 164)."	Lord Moulton; Lord Parker of Waddington; **Lord Sumner**	Appeal dismissed	Court of Appeal of British Columbia
The British Columbia Electric Railway Limited v. Violet Gentile	[1914] UKPC 52	"The appellants are a company working the tramways in the streets of the city of Vancouver. This they do as assignees of the Consolidated Railway Company incorporated by cap. 55 of the Acts of British Columbia, 1896. The respondent is the administratix of Vernon Aldrich, deceased, who was struck and killed by one of the appellants' cars on 7th October 1911."	**Lord Dunedin**; Lord Sumner; Lord Moulton; Sir George Farwell; Lord Parker of Waddington	Appeal dismissed	Court of Appeal of British Columbia
David Cook v. The City of Vancouver	[1914] UKPC 55	"In this case the appellant (the plaintiff in the action) claims an injunction against the defendants, who are the Corporation of the City of Vancouver, restraining them from diverting water from a stream flowing through certain lands of which he is the owner."	**Lord Moulton**; Lord Parker of Waddington; Lord Sumner	Appeal dismissed	Court of Appeal of British Columbia
The British Columbia Electric Railway Company, Limited v. The Vancouver, Victoria and Eastern Railway and Navigation Company and others	[1914] UKPC 56	"The appellants, the British Columbia Electric Railway Company, Limited (referred to herein as the 'Tramway Company') are a company operating street railways in the city of Vancouver under powers conferred upon them by an Act of the Legislature of the province of the British Columbia. Their railways are local street railways wholly situated within the province of British Columbia and have not been declared to be for the general advantage of Canada or for the advantage of two or more provinces, so that they have not passed into the domain of legislation of the Dominion Parliament."	**Lord Moulton**; Lord Sumner; Lord Parker of Waddington; Sir George Farwell	Appeal allowed	Supreme Court of Canada
The Canadian Collieries (Dunsmuir), Limited and another v. James Dunsmuir and others; and James Dunsmuir v. The Canadian Collieries (Dunsmuir), Limited and others	[1914] UKPC 59	"On 3rd January 1910 Mr. James Dunsmuir entered into an agreement with Mr. Robert Thomas Elliott with reference to The Wellington Colliery Company, Limited, of British Columbia, and the Robert Dunsmuir Sons Company, of California, the benefit of which was subsequently assigned by Mr. Elliott to Sir William Mackenzie, and by him reassigned to the Canadian Collieries (Dunsmuir), Limited, now Appellants."	Lord Moulton; **Lord Sumner**; Sir George Farwell	Appeal allowed in part	British Columbia Court of Appeal
Robert Davies v. The James Bay Railway Company and The James Bay Railway Company v. Robert Davies	[1914] UKPC 60	"This appeal raises a question of importance as to the interpretation of the Railway Act of Canada. The case has been twice argued before the Judicial Committee. At the conclusion of the first argument it became clear that, of several points at first raised, the real one on which the parties had been so divided as to be unable to come to a settlement, was the point which became by agreement the exclusive subject of argument on the second hearing."	**Viscount Haldane, Lord Chancellor**; Lord Sumner; Earl Loreburn; Sir George Farwell; Lord Moulton	Appeal allowed	Court of Appeal for Ontario
Douglas Brothers v. The Acadia Fire Insurance Company	[1914] UKPC 61	"This is an appeal from a judgment of the Supreme Court of Nova Scotia, which by a majority of three to two, reversed the judgment of Russell, J., the Trial Judge. The question relates to the construction of a written agreement. The appellants are insurance brokers, and the respondents are an Insurance Company."	**Viscount Haldane, Lord Chancellor**; Sir Charles Fitzpatrick, CJC; Lord Moulton; Sir Arthur Channell; Lord Sumner	Appeal allowed	Court of Appeal for Nova Scotia
The Canadian Pacific Railway Company and others v. The Canadian Oil Companies, Limited and The Canadian Pacific Railway Company v. The British American Oil Company, Limited	[1914] UKPC 62	"In these consolidated appeals exception is taken to the unanimous judgment of the Supreme Court of Canada affirming a determination of the Board of Railway Commissioners. The dispute arose in connection with the through rates charged by the Canadian Railway Companies on petroleum and its products carried from certain points in Ohio and Pennsylvania to Toronto and other points in Canada."	Viscount Haldane, Lord Chancellorr; Lord Parker of Waddington; **Lord Dunedin**; Lord Sumner; Lord Moulton	Appeal dismissed	Supreme Court of Canada
The Molsons Bank v. J.B. Klock	[1914] UKPC 65	"This is an appeal from three concurrent judgments in a case in which the decision must ultimately turn on the view which the Court takes of the facts. There is no question of law whatever involved in it, but their Lordships do not think that they involve any serious difficulty when once there has been a pronouncement by the Court that has the best opportunity of judging of the reliability of the witnesses, and in this case the Judge of first instance has found the material issue in favour of the respondent."	**Lord Moulton**; Sir Charles Fitzpatrick, CJC; Lord Sumner; Sir Joshua Williams	Appeal dismissed	Quebec Court of King's Bench (Appeal Side)
Donald Fraser, Senr., and others v. Alphonse Dumont	[1914] UKPC 72	"This was an appeal by special leave from a judgment of the Supreme Court of Canada reversing a judgment of the Court of King's Bench for the Province of Quebec, and restoring a judgment of the Superior Court for that Province whereby judgment was entered for the respondent against the appellants for $2,500.00 damages."	Viscount Haldane, Lord Chancellor; Lord Sumner; Lord Moulton; **Sir Arthur Channell**	Appeal dismissed	Supreme Court of Canada
Dame Alma de St. Aubin and another v. George Azarie Binet	[1914] UKPC 73	"Madame Georges St. Pierre sues in her maiden name of de St. Aubin for a declaration that an instrument, which she made in favour of the defendant, dated 27th August 1909, is void and should be annulled."	Lord Moulton; Sir Charles Fitzpatrick, CJC; **Lord Sumner**; Sir Arthur Channell	Appeal dismissed	Quebec Court of King's Bench (Appeal Side)
The City of Halifax v. The Nova Scotia Car Works Limited	[1914] UKPC 78	"The respondents own a manufactory in Halifax, Nova Scotia, situated on four streets. In 1908, 1910 and 1911 the City of Halifax made public sewers in these streets under the City charter, and under its six hundredth section required the respondents, as owners of land and buildings fronting the sewers, to pay $2387.34 towards the cost of their construction."	Viscount Haldane, Lord Chancellor; Lord Moulton; **Lord Sumner**	Appeal dismissed	Supreme Court of Canada
Charles J. Wills and others v. The Central Railway Company of Canada	[1914] UKPC 79	"The Appellants in this case are the Plaintiffs in the action and are a firm of contractors carrying on business in Westminster and having an office (among other places) in Montreal, in the Dominion of Canada. The Respondent is a railway company whose head office and principal place of business is in Montreal. It was incorporated for the purpose of constructing and operating a railway between the town of Midland, on the Georgian Bay, and a point in the vicinity of the city of Montreal."	**Lord Moulton**; Lord Sumner; Sir Charles Fitzpatrick, CJC; Sir Joshua Williams	Appeal dismissed	Quebec Court of King's Bench (Appeal Side)
Edward Feltham Coates and others v. The Sovereign Bank of Canada	[1914] UKPC 80	"The respondent, the Sovereign Bank of Canada, is a corporation (now in liquidation) incorporated under the Canadian Bank Act and having its head office in Montreal. It general manager in the year 1906, which is the material date in the present case, was Mr. D. M. Stewart. By virtue of the provisions of the Canadian Bank Act, no banking company incorporated under it may purchase or deal in its own capital stock nor indeed the capital stock of any bank."	Viscount Haldane, Lord Chancellor; **Lord Moulton**; Sir Charles Fitzpatrick, CJC	Appeal dismissed	Quebec Court of King's Bench (Appeal Side)
J. Henry Peters v. Angus Sinclair	[1914] UKPC 81	"This was an action of trespass brought to determine the claim of the defendant to open a gate from his property into Ancroft Place in the City of Toronto (the solum of which belongs to the plaintiff in fee), and to pass freely, in and out, to Sherbourne Street and the rest of the City."	Viscount Haldane, Lord Chancellor; **Lord Sumner**; Lord Moulton; Sir Joshua Williams	Appeal dismissed	Supreme Court of Canada
The Windsor, Essex, and Lake Shore Rapid Railway Company v. A.J. Nelles and another	[1914] UKPC 82	"The Plaintiffs and Respondents in this case were engineers and contractors, and acted as promoters in making preliminary arrangements and negotiating franchises through the different municipalities for the Defendant Company, now Appellants."	**Lord Dunedin**; Sir Charles Fitzpatrick, CJC; Lord Parmoor	Appeal dismissed	Supreme Court of Canada
The Attorney-General for the Province of Alberta v. The Attorney-General for the Dominion of Canada and The Canadian Pacific Railway Company (Intervenant)	[1914] UKPC 84	"The present appeal related to two questions which were referred by HRH the Governor in Council for the hearing and consideration of the Supreme Court of Canada pursuant to section 60 of the Supreme Court Act. These question relate to the validity of section 7 of chapter 15 of the Acts of the Legislature of the Province of Alberta of 1912, intituled an Act to amend the Railway Act."	Viscount Haldane, Lord Chancellor; Sir Charles Fitzpatrick, CJC; **Lord Moulton**; Sir Joshua Williams; Lord Sumner	Appeal dismissed	Supreme Court of Canada
The John Deere Plow Company, Limited v. Theodore F. Wharton and another (Respondents) and The Attorney-General for the Dominion of Canada and the Attorney-General for the Province of British Columbia (Intervenants)	[1914] UKPC 87	"These are consolidated appeals from judgments of the Supreme Court of British Columbia. The Attorney-General for the Dominion and the Attorney-General for the Province have intervened. By the first of the judgments the appellant company was restrained at the suit of the respondent Wharton from carrying on business in the Province until the company should have become licensed under Part VI of the British Columbia Companies Act. By the second judgment the appellant's action against the respondent Duck for goods sold and delivered was dismissed. The real question in both cases is one of importance. It concerns the distribution between the Dominion and the Provincial Legislatures of powers as regards incorporated companies."	**Viscount Haldane, Lord Chancellor**; Sir Charles Fitzpatrick, CJC; Lord Moulton; Sir Joshua Williams; Lord Sumner	Appeal allowed	Supreme Court of British Columbia
Mildred Howard v. William Miller and another	[1914] UKPC 90	"In this case the Plaintiffs claim specific performance of an agreement dated the 1st of June 1908, and made between the Defendant, Mary Jane Sheard, of the one part, and the Plaintiff, Miller, of the other part, whereby the Defendant, Mary Jane Sheard, contracted to sell and the Plaintiff, Miller, to purchase, some 414 acres of land in the Vancouver District in British Columbia."	Lord Moulton; Lord Parker of Waddington; **Lord Sumner**	Appeal allowed	Supreme Court of Canada
Adam Uffelmann v. The Stecher Lithographic Company and others	[1914] UKPC 91	"The Ontario Seed Company, Limited, was in August 1909 indebted to the Merchants Bank of Canada in the sum of $8,254. In respect of this sum Jacob Uffelmann, Secretary Treasurer of the Company, and brother of the appellant, was liable to the Bank as surety under a bond and as indorser of notes discounted by the Company to the extent of $7,700. The Bank also held as security an assignment of the book debts of the Company."	**Lord Dunedin**; Sir Joshua Williams; Lord Moulton	Appeal dismissed	Supreme Court of Canada
The Toronto Suburban Railway Company v. The Corporation of the City of Toronto	[1915] UKPC 4	"This is an Appeal from a judgment of the Appellate Division of the Supreme Court of Ontario affirming, with a variation on a minor point, an order of the Ontario Railway and Municipal Board. The question in the case which presents real difficulty arises on the construction of an agreement made on the 4th September 1899, and confirmed by the Toronto Suburban Street Railway Company Act, 1900."	**Viscount Haldane, Lord Chancellor**; Lord Parker of Waddington; Lord Dunedin; Lord Sumner; Sir Joshua Williams	Appeal allowed	Supreme Court of Ontario (Appellate Division)
The Toronto Power Company Limited v. Kate Paskwan	[1915] UKPC 20	"This is an appeal from the judgment of the Appellate Division of the Supreme Court of Ontario confirming the judgment of Mr. Justice Kelly whereby he directed judgment to be entered, after a trial before a jury, in favour of the respondent for the sum of six thousand dollars. The respondent is the widow of one John Paskwan, who was killed on the 8th February 1913 by an accident on the works of the appellant company, in whose service he then was, having entered their employment on that day."	Lord Atkinson; Sir George Farwell; Lord Parmoor; **Sir Arthur Channell**	Appeal dismissed	Supreme Court of Ontario (Appellate Division)
The Grand Trunk Railway Company of Canada v. Albert Nelson Robinson	[1915] UKPC 21	"The question raised in this appeal relates to the right of the respondent, who was plaintiff in an action in the High Court of Justice for Ontario, to recover damages against the appellants for injuries suffered by him in an accident on the appellants' railway. He was travelling in charge of a horse consigned under what is known as a 'Livestock special contract,' in a form authorised by the railway commissioner for Canada. The terms of the contract purported to relieve the appellants from liability for injuries arising from accident, even where caused by negligence, to a person travelling with the live stock, in case he had been permitted to travel at less than full fare."	**Viscount Haldane, Lord Chancellor**; Sir George Farwell; Lord Dunedin; Sir Arthur Channell; Lord Parmoor	Appeal allowed	Supreme Court of Canada
The Eastern Trust Company v. McKenzie Mann and Company, Limited	[1915] UKPC 22	"This is an appeal from a judgment of the Supreme Court of Canada (Duff, J., dissenting), which reversed the unanimous judgment of the Supreme Court of Nova Scotia, dated the 5th July 1913, varying the report dated the 15th January 1912, of the referee appointed by the Court in this action. The action is a partnership action between James Irvine, since deceased, as plaintiff, and Robert G. Hervey and others as defendants, and a decree was made therein by Graham, J., on the 13th March 1905, whereby the partnership was dissolved and certain accounts and inquiries were directed to be taken by a referee appointed by the Court."	Viscount Haldane, Lord Chancellor; Lord Atkinson; **Sir George Farwell**; Sir Arthur Channell; Lord Parmoor	Appeal allowed	Supreme Court of Canada
Edward Odlum and others v. The City of Vancouver and Canadian Northern Pacific Railway Company	[1915] UKPC 26	"This is an appeal against a judgment of the Court of Appeal of British Columbia, by which that Court by a majority of four to one reversed a judgment of Morrison, J., and set aside an award pronounced by Frederic Buscombe as sole arbitrator in an arbitration between the parties to the case. The appellants are the owners of certain lots of ground in the city of Vancouver, which front Westminster Avenue and are bounded at the back by an arm of the sea called False Creek."	Lord Buckmaster, Lord Chancellor; **Lord Dunedin**; Lord Atkinson	Appeal allowed	Court of Appeal of British Columbia
The Canadian Pacific Railway Company v. Joseph Arthur Fréchette	[1915] UKPC 32	"This is an appeal from a judgment of the Court of King's Bench of Quebec (Appeal Side), dated the 9th March 1914, confirming the judgment of the Superior Court, sitting in Review, dated the 28th November 1913, whereby damages amounting to the sum of $12,000.00 were, in accordance with the verdict of the jury which tried the case, awarded to the respondent in respect of personal injuries sustained by him through the negligence of the appellants, while he was engaged in working as a brakesman shunting a freight car or waggon on the line at Princess Louise Basin at Quebec."	Stanley Buckmaster, 1st Viscount Buckmaster; Lord Dunedin; **Lord Atkinson**	Appeal allowed	Quebec Court of King's Bench (Appeal Side)
The Canadian Pacific Railway Company v. Frank McDonald	[1915] UKPC 43	"The question which their Lordships have to decide arises as follows:— The respondent was a railway man employed by the appellants. He suffered serious injury in an accident, the result of which was that he was partially but permanently incapacitated. He claimed that this entitled him to compensation, under the Workmen's Compensation Act of the Province of Quebec, to the extent of a rent or annuity for his life of $337.50, being half of the amount by which his earning capacity had been reduced by the injury."	**Viscount Haldane**; Lord Parker of Waddington; Lord Sumner	Appeal dismissed	Quebec Court of King's Bench (Appeal Side)
The British Columbia Electric Railway Company Limited v. T.K. Loach Administrator of the Estate of Benjamin Sands deceased	[1915] UKPC 46	"This is an appeal from a judgment of the Court of Appeal of British Columbia in favour of the administrator of the estate of Benjamin Sands, who was run down at a level crossing by a car of the appellant railway company and was killed."	Viscount Haldane; Lord Parker of Waddington; **Lord Sumner**	Appeal dismissed	British Columbia Court of Appeal
The Holt Timber Company Limited v. Albert McCallum	[1915] UKPC 48	"The appellants in this case are a Timber Company, who hold timber licenses from the Province of Ontario, in the District of Parry Sound, and the respondent is a lumberman, who, during the season of 1912 and 1913, carried out logging operations for the appellants."	**Stanley Buckmaster, 1st Viscount Buckmaster**; Lord Parker of Waddington; Viscount Haldane; Lord Sumner	Appeal dismissed	Supreme Court of Ontario (Appellate Division)
Charles F. Curry and another v. Gordon M. McGregor	[1915] UKPC 67	"Their Lordships do not think it necessary to hear the respondent in this case. Under ordinary circumstances they would take time to consider their judgment, but the case is one which now that the point as to the Statute of Frauds turns out to be untenable, may be disposed of, with a single observation. The remaining and only real contest is one as to the effect of the agreement in question, and as to this two courts have found substantially to the same effect. Under these circumstances their Lordships see no reason for disturbing the judgment of the trial judge; and they will humbly advise His Majesty to dismiss the appeal with costs."	**Viscount Haldane**; Lord Parker of Waddington; Lord Sumner	Appeal dismissed	Supreme Court of Ontario (Appellate Division)
The Central Trust and Safe Deposit Company and another v. Harvey G. Snider and others	[1915] UKPC 72	"The questions for decision in this case concern the title to certain hereditaments in Toronto, known as 78, Bay Street, and arise under the following circumstance:— The late Martin Edward Snider died in the year 1888 intestate. He was at the time of his death the owner of the property in question, which then consisted of about 23 feet of frontage on the west side of Bay Street, with a small half-brick residence erected thereon. He left two children, Thomas E. Snider and the defendant, Mabel Carleton, and the property devolved upon them as his co-heirs. After their father's death they went to live with their uncle, Thomas A. Snider, hereinafter referred to as the testator."	Viscount Haldane; **Lord Parker of Waddington**; Lord Sumner	Appeal allowed	Supreme Court of Ontario (Appellate Division)
Foley Brothers and others v. James A. McIlwee and others	[1916] UKPC 1	"This is a dispute arising out of a contract between Messrs. Foley Brothers and Messrs. McIlwee and Sons. Messrs. McIlwee, who are the plaintiffs, agreed to construct a tunnel some 5 miles long. It would be necessary to make the tunnel from both ends."	**Earl Loreburn**; Lord Atkinson; Lord Parker of Waddington; Lord Sumner	Appeal dismissed	Court of Appeal of British Columbia
John Livingston and others v. James Livingston	[1916] UKPC 3	"The death of Mr. John Livingston of Listowel, Ontario, on the 21st May, 1896, brought to an end a partnership with his younger brother James, which had lasted for some forty years. It was a remarkable example of mutual confidence and affection. The brothers came to Canada as quite young men, and agreed that for their earnings they would have a common purse and in all their enterprises a common venture. They never had any articles of partnership; they never had, even by parol, any more definite terms of arrangements."	Viscount Haldane; Lord Parker of Waddington; **Lord Sumner**	Appeal allowed in part	Supreme Court of Ontario (Appellate Division)
The Ontario Power Company of Nigeria Falls v. The Municipal Corporation of the Township of Stamford	[1916] UKPC 5	"In this case the Ontario Power Company of Niagara Falls claims that its property within the Municipal Corporation of the township of Stamford should be assessed for the purpose of all rates at the sum, fixed and unalterable until 1924, of 100,000 dollars."	**Lord Buckmaster, Lord Chancellor**; Viscount Haldane; Lord Sumner	Appeal dismissed	Supreme Court of Ontario (Appellate Division)
Ernest Holditch v. The Canadian Northern Ontario Railway Company	[1916] UKPC 6	"The Appellant owns a considerable area of building land near Sudbury, Ontario, part of which the Respondent Railway Company desired to take for the purposes of their line. The property had been marked out in numbered lots, and the Railway Company's notice specified twenty of these lots by their numbers as the land to be taken. The sum offered was 3,300 dollars. It was unsatisfactory to Mr. Holditch, and this claim accordingly went to arbitration."	Viscount Haldane; Lord Parker of Waddington; **Lord Sumner**	Appeal dismissed	Supreme Court of Canada
A.B. Cook v George S. Deeks and others	[1916] UKPC 10	"The appellant in this case is the plaintiff in a suit brought against the respondents, under circumstances to which full reference is necessary; his rights depend entirely upon the fact that he is, and has, throughout the whole history of these proceedings, been, a shareholder in the Toronto Construction Company, Limited, one of the defendants in the suit."	**Lord Buckmaster, Lord Chancellor**; Lord Parker of Waddington; Viscount Haldane; Lord Sumner	Appeal allowed	Supreme Court of Ontario (Appellate Division)
The Bonanza Creek Gold Mining Company Limited v. The King and another	[1916] UKPC 11	"This is an appeal from a judgment of the Supreme Court of Canada in a petition of right which gave rise to questions of constitutional importance as to the position of joint-stock companies, incorporated within the provinces, but seeking to carry on their business beyond the provincial boundaries."	Lord Buckmaster, Lord Chancellor; **Viscount Haldane**; Lord Parker of Waddington; Lord Sumner	Appeal dismissed	Supreme Court of Canada
The Attorney-General for Canada v. The Attorneys-General for Alberta, Manitoba, New Brunswick, Nova Scotia, Ontario, Quebec, Saskatchewan, and British Columbia, the Canadian Insurance Federation, and the Canadian Manufacturers' Association	[1916] UKPC 12	"This is an appeal from a judgment of the Supreme Court of Canada answering certain questions put to the Judges by a reference from the Government of the Dominion. The questions so referred were as follows:— 1. Are sects. 4 and 70 of the Insurance Act, 1910, or any and what part of parts of the said sections, ultra vires of the Parliament of Canada? 2. Does sect. 4 of the Insurance Act, 1910, operate to prohibit an insurance company incorporated by a foreign State from carrying on the business of insurance within Canada, if such company does not hold a licence from the Minister under the said Act, and if such carrying on of the business is confined to a single province?"	Lord Buckmaster, Lord Chancellor; **Viscount Haldane**; Lord Parker of Waddington; Lord Sumner	Appeal allowed in part	Supreme Court of Canada
The Attorneys-General for Ontario, Quebec, Nova Scotia, New Brunswick, Manitoba, Prince Edward Island Alberta and Saskatchewan v. The Attorney-General for Canada and The Attorney-General for British Columbia and the Canadian Manufacturers' Association	[1916] UKPC 13	"Of the questions before the Board in this appeal some have already been disposed of by the judgment already delivered in the case of the John Deere Plow Company v. Wharton (1915, A.C. 330), the Bonanza Company, and the Insurance Act reference. In the first of these cases, in which the judgments in the Supreme Court of Canada in the present reference were brought to their notice, their Lordships indicated that the task of answering the questions on the interpretation of the British North America Act imposed on the learned Judges in the Court below was one which it was in their own opinion, impossible satisfactorily to accomplish. They gave reasons for thinking that the abstract and general character of the questions put rendered it unsafe in the interests of justice to future suitors to attempt to answer them completely."	Lord Buckmaster, Lord Chancellor; **Viscount Haldane**; Lord Parker of Waddington; Lord Sumner	Questions answered	Supreme Court of Canada
Sir Rodolphe Forget v. The Cement Products Company of Canada and another	[1916] UKPC 45	"The facts upon which this case depends are to be found in the circumstances attending the formation of the respondent company and the issue of part of its preference capital. The letters patent, incorporating the company, the articles and memorandum of association, and the preliminary documents lending up to its incorporation, were not put in evidence at the trial and neither the appellant nor any person having first-hand information of the material circumstances was called as a witness – an omission which, in their Lordships' opinion has greatly embarrassed all the Courts by whom this case has been considered."	**Lord Buckmaster, Lord Chancellor**; Earl Loreburn; Lord Shaw; Sir Arthur Channell	Appeal dismissed	Quebec Court of King's Bench (Appeal Side)
The Corporation of the City of Toronto v. The Toronto Railway Company	[1916] UKPC 52	"This appeal has arisen out of an application by the respondent company to the Ontario Railway and Municipal Board, under section 250 of 'The Ontario Railway Act of 1914,' asking the approval of plans for a proposed extension of a street railway."	**Lord Buckmaster, Lord Chancellor**; Earl Loreburn; Lord Shaw	Appeal dismissed	Supreme Court of Ontario (Appellate Division)
The Hamilton, Grimsby, and Beamsville Railway Company v. The Attorney General for the Province of Ontario and Others	[1916] UKPC 68	"This is an appeal of the Hamilton, Grimsby, and Beamsville Railway Company against a judgment of the Appellate Division of the Supreme Court of Ontario, affirming an order of the Ontario Railway and Municipal Board, dated the 10th May, 1915. The order of the Railway Board directed that the appellants should construct certain sanitary conveniences on their railway, and the appeal against that order was brought, not because the appellants objected to the construction of the sanitary conveniences, but because they asserted that the Ontario Railway and Municipal Board had no jurisdiction whatever to make the order, inasmuch as their railway was really a Dominion Railway, and not in any way under the control of the Provincial Board."	**Lord Buckmaster, Lord Chancellor**; Viscount Haldane; Lord Atkinson; Lord Shaw; Lord Parmoor	Appeal dismissed	Supreme Court of Ontario (Appellate Division)
La Corporation de la Ville de Thetford Mines v. Amalgamated Asbestos Corporation, Limited	[1916] UKPC 73	"The resolution of the dispute in this case depends upon the true meaning to be given to a short, but equivocal section in a Statute of Quebec (5 Edw. VII, cap. 48), by which the appellants were incorporated. The question raised is as to the liability of the respondents, who are a mining company, to pay a sum of 1,711.60 dollars, the proportion, assessed in respect of their buildings, machinery, and fixtures, of a special tax levied by the Corporation for the purpose of providing an aqueduct and waterworks for the town."	**Lord Buckmaster, Lord Chancellor**; Viscount Haldane; Lord Atkinson; Lord Shaw; Lord Parmoor	Appeal allowed	Quebec Court of King's Bench (Appeal Side)
Charlotte Brickles, Executrix of the Estate of Isaac Brickles, deceased v. William H. Snell	[1916] UKPC 75	"This is an appeal by special leave from a judgment of the Supreme Court of Canada, dated the 23rd February, 1914, allowing, by a majority of three to two, an appeal from a unanimous judgment of five members of the Appellate Division of the Supreme Court of Ontario dated the 18th March, 1913, setting aside the judgment at the trial dated the 26th November, 1912."	Lord Buckmaster, Lord Chancellor; Viscount Haldane; **Lord Atkinson**; Lord Shaw; Lord Parmoor	Appeal allowed	Supreme Court of Canada
Alexander Smith v. The Council of the Rural Municipality of Vermillion Hills No. 195 and another	[1916] UKPC 76	"This appeal arises out of an action in which the appellant was held liable in the Courts below to pay a sum of $3,118.78, being the amount assessed as tax upon certain lands in the Province of Saskatchewan. The appellant's interest in these lands was conferred by leases from the Crown, granted to him by the Dominion Government, for grazing purposes. The lands were situated within a local improvement district, which was subsequently organised as a municipality under a statute of the province. The tax in question was assessed by this municipality, which was the plaintiff in the action and is the respondent on this appeal."	Lord Buckmaster, Lord Chancellor; **Viscount Haldane**; Lord Atkinson; Lord Shaw; Lord Parmoor	Appeal dismissed	Supreme Court of Canada
Andrew Joseph Drewry and Others v. Phœbe Jane Drewry	[1916] UKPC 83	"This is an appeal from an order of the Appellate Division of the Supreme Court of Alberta, dated the 24th March, 1916, which order dismissed an appeal from the judgment of the Supreme Court of Alberta, dated the 17th January, 1916. The question in the case depends upon the view which is taken of certain provisions of the Married Women's Relief Act of the Province of Alberta."	Lord Buckmaster, Lord Chancellor; Viscount Haldane; Lord Atkinson; **Lord Shaw**; Lord Parmoor	Appeal allowed	Supreme Court of Alberta (Appellate Division)
The Corporation of the City of Toronto v. The Consumers' Gas Company of Toronto	[1916] UKPC 84	"The action out of which this appeal arose was brought by the appellants, the City of Toronto, against the respondents, the Consumers' Gas Company, to recover the cost of lowering a 20-inch gas main belonging to the defendants on Eastern Avenue at or near the intersection of the avenue with Carlaw Avenue, both avenues being public streets of Toronto."	Lord Buckmaster, Lord Chancellor; Viscount Haldane; Lord Atkinson; **Lord Shaw**; Lord Parmoor	Appeal dismissed	Supreme Court of Ontario (Appellate Division)
The Toronto Electric Light Company Limited v. The Corporation of the City of Toronto	[1916] UKPC 86	"This is an appeal from a judgment of the First Appellate Division of the Supreme Court of Ontario, dated the 15th March, 1915, whereby the judgment of Middleton, J., in favour of the appellant, the plaintiff in the suit, was set aside and it was ordered that, subject to certain declarations therein set out, the action should be dismissed with costs."	Viscount Haldane; **Lord Atkinson**; Lord Shaw; Lord Parmoor	Appeal dismissed	Ontario Supreme Court (Appellate Division)
The Toronto and York Railway Company v. The Corporation of the City of Toronto	[1916] UKPC 88	"The appellants applied, under section 250 of an Act respecting Railways, R.S.O., 1914, c. 185, to the Ontario Railway and Municipal Board for the approval of certain plans to provide the necessary switches and turnouts to the appellants' property required by them for the purpose of operating their railway."	Viscount Haldane; Lord Atkinson; Lord Shaw; **Lord Parmoor**	Appeal allowed	Supreme Court of Ontario (Appellate Division)
The Board of Trustees of the City of Ottawa v. R. Mackell and Others	[1916] UKPC 92	"The appeal raises an important question as to the validity of a Circular of Instructions issued by the Department of Education for the Province of Ontario on the 17th August, 1913."	**Lord Buckmaster, Lord Chancellor**; Viscount Haldane; Lord Atkinson; Lord Shaw; Lord Parmoor	Appeal dismissed	Supreme Court of Ontario (Appellate Division)
The Board of Trustees of the Roman Catholic Separate Schools of the City of Ottawa and others v. The Corporation of the City of Ottawa and others; and The Same v. The Quebec Bank	[1916] UKPC 93	"The question raised in these consolidated appeals is whether section (3) of 5 George V, c. 45 (1915), Ontario, is valid and within the competency of the provincial legislature. The appellants contend that this section prejudicially affects certain rights and privileges with respect to denominational schools reserved under provision (1) of section 93 of 'The British North America Act, 1867'."	**Lord Buckmaster, Lord Chancellor**; Viscount Haldane; Lord Atkinson; Lord Shaw; Lord Parmoor	Appeal allowed	Supreme Court of Ontario (Appellate Division)
The Tilbury Town Gas Company (Limited) v. The Maple City Oil and Gas Company (Limited) and Others	[1916] UKPC 94	"This is an appeal by the Tilbury Town Gas Company from a judgment of the Appellate Division of the Supreme Court of Ontario, dated the 31st December, 1915. That judgment allowed the appeal of the defendant company from the judgment of Lennox, J., in favour of the plaintiff company, dated the 10th February 1915. The business of the plaintiff company is that of distributing and selling natural gas. This gas is found in considerable quantities in what is known as the Tilbury Field in the County of Kent, Ontario."	Lord Buckmaster, Lord Chancellor; Viscount Haldane; Lord Atkinson; **Lord Shaw**	Appeal dismissed	Supreme Court of Ontario (Appellate Division)
The Montreal Public Service Corporation v. Evariste Champagne	[1916] UKPC 104	"Their Lordships do not desire to hear the respondent in this case, for in their opinion the appeal fails. The real question in dispute is whether or no the appellants have committed such a breach of a contract made by them with the respondent as to entitle the respondent to treat the contract as determined and upon this basis to sue for damages."	**Lord Buckmaster, Lord Chancellor**; Lord Dunedin; Lord Parker of Waddington; Lord Wrenbury; Sir Arthur Channell	Appeal dismissed	Superior Court of Quebec
Mackenzie, Mann, and Co. (Limited) and others v. The Eastern Trust Company	[1916] UKPC 109	"In this case their Lordships think that they are bound to give effect to the arrangement that was made on the previous hearing, and they realise that the Order in Council of the 29th April, 1915, that was then drawn up, did not carry into effect that arrangement. It is therefore necessary that the Order should be varied, and their Lordships propose to vary it in the terms hereinafter referred to."	**Lord Buckmaster, Lord Chancellor**; Viscount Haldane; Lord Dunedin; Lord Parker of Waddington; Sir Arthur Channell	Appeal allowed	Supreme Court of Nova Scotia
Ernest L. Ruddy v. The Toronto Eastern Railway Company	[1917] UKPC 1	"On the 27th November, 1914, an award was made, in pursuance of the provisions of the Dominion Railway Act of Canada, assessing at the sum of 3,500 dollars the amount to be paid by the respondents – the Toronto Eastern Railway Company – for the compulsory expropriation of land necessary to enable the respondents to run a railway across the appellant's property on the west of the City of Toronto."	**Lord Buckmaster, Lord Chancellor**; Lord Dunedin; Lord Parker of Waddington; Lord Parmoor; Lord Wrenbury	Appeal dismissed	Supreme Court of Canada
The Montreal Street Railway Company and another v. Roch Normandin	[1917] UKPC 2	"The respondent in this case was plaintiff in an action against the appellant company in the Superior Court at Quebec to recover damages for personal injuries sustained by him when travelling in a tramcar of the appellants by a collision with another tramcar of the same company. The action was tried before a special jury, who gave a verdict for the plaintiff for 12,000 dollars on the 12th December, 1912, and judgment was given for the plaintiff for that amount. The appellants on the 10th January, 1913, took proceedings to have the judgment set aside on the ground that the jury had not been duly constituted and was without jurisdiction, and also that one of the jurors was relative to and was connected by affinity with the plaintiff and was not indifferent between the parties, and also that in the course of the trial communications in reference to the case passed between the plaintiff, his relatives, and those who were conducting his case, and that juror and other jurors."	Lord Buckmaster, Lord Chancellor; Viscount Haldane; Lord Dunedin; Lord Parker of Waddington; **Sir Arthur Channell**	Appeal dismissed	Quebec Superior Court
La Compagnie de Pulpe de Chicoutimi v. La Compagnie de Pulpe de Jonquière	[1917] UKPC 3	"The appellants and respondents are owners of mills driven by water power situated on the Chicoutimi and Sables Rivers respectively. These two rivers issue from Lake Kenogami at opposite ends. For many years Lake Kenogami has been used as a reservoir of water. To effect a proper storage, dams were constructed on the two rivers at Portage des Roches on the Chicoutimi River, and Pibrec on the Sables River. Quarrels arose between the mill owners, and various litigations ensued, but the whole matter was eventually settled by an agreement and contract of date the 23rd August, 1904, which contract it is common ground is binding, and regulates according to its terms the rights of the parties."	Lord Buckmaster, Lord Chancellor; Viscount Haldane; **Lord Dunedin**; Lord Parker of Waddington; Sir Arthur Channell	Appeal dismissed	Quebec Court of King's Bench (Appeal Side)
Dame Alice Fraser and Others v. The City of Fraserville	[1917] UKPC 7	"The appellants in this case are the plaintiffs in an action brought by them against the respondent and the defendants in an action brought by the respondent against them. The object of the appellants' action was to enforce an award of arbitrators dated the 27th November, 1911, by which the sum of 75,700 dollars was fixed as the sum to be paid by the respondent to the appellants in full compensation for the expropriation of certain property. "	**Lord Buckmaster, Lord Chancellor**; Viscount Haldane; Lord Dunedin; Lord Parker of Waddington; Sir Arthur Channell	Appeal dismissed	Quebec Court of King's Bench (Appeal Side)
Mary Wood and Others v. James Ebenezer Haines	[1917] UKPC 8	"This is an appeal against the judgment of the Appellate Division of the Supreme Court of Ontario, which set aside the judgment of the trial judge and dismissed the action. The action was brought to recover a sum of 29,000 dollars paid by one Jas. Johnston to the respondent Haines under certain six transactions to be presently mentioned, and interest upon the amount. Johnston has died pending the action. The appellants are his executors. The transaction in question took place between the year 1906 and the summer of 1908. The action was commenced on the 4 December, 1914; but no question is raised upon the Statute of Limitation. Their Lordships hold, and the respondent does not dispute, that the defendant stood towards the plaintiff in the position of a fiduciary agent, so that no question upon the Statute arises."	Viscount Haldane; Lord Parker of Waddington; **Lord Wrenbury**	Appeal allowed	Supreme Court of Ontario (Appellate Division)
The Dominion Iron and Steel Company (Limited) v. C.W. Burt, George C. Topshee, Mrs. Emily Burns, Joseph Jamael and John Kattar	[1917] UKPC 9	"The question arising for decision on this appeal is whether the appellant railway company in carrying out certain works in Victoria Road in the City of Sydney (Nova Scotia) acted illegally so as to be liable to a common law action of nuisance at the suit of the respondents, who have admittedly suffered special damage, or whether it acted legally under its statutory powers, so that the respondents' remedy is by way of compensation under the provisions of Nova Scotia Railways Act (C. 99 of the Revised Statutes of Nova Scotia, 1900)."	Lord Buckmaster, Lord Chancellor; Viscount Haldane; Lord Dunedin; **Lord Parker of Waddington**; Sir Arthur Channell	Appeal dismissed	Supreme Court of Nova Scotia
The Canadian Pacific Railway Company v. Dame Leosophie Parent and another	[1917] UKPC 10	"This appeal raises questions of importance on which there has been considerable divergence of opinion among the learned Judges in the Courts below. These Courts have, however, for varying reasons, agreed in holding that the Chief Justice of Quebec, who tried the case, was right in his decree that the respondents were entitled to damages from the appellants for having by the negligence of their servants caused a collision which resulted in the death of one Joseph Chalifour."	**Viscount Haldane**; Lord Dunedin; Lord Parker of Waddington; Lord Parmoor; Lord Wrenbury	Appeal allowed	Supreme Court of Canada
The Municipal Corporation of the Township of Cornwall v. The Ottawa and New York Railway Company and others and The Attorney-General for the Province of Ontario	[1917] UKPC 38	"This is an appeal from a judgment of the Supreme Court of Canada confirming a judgment of the Supreme Court of Ontario. Special leave to appeal was granted by His Majesty in Council on the 18th August, 1916, the appellants undertaking not to raise on appeal the question that the Railway and Municipal Board of Ontario had no jurisdiction to hear the appeal direct from the Court of Revision or that the Appellate Division of the Supreme Court of Ontario, or the Supreme Court of Canada had no jurisdiction to entertain the appeals to these courts. The question which was left open for the appellants to raise is, whether a railway bridge, which is described in the assessment as an international bridge between Canada and the United States of America, is assessable to municipal taxation, so far as it is situated within the Canadian boundary."	Lord Buckmaster; Lord Parker of Waddington; Lord Sumner; **Lord Parmoor**; Sir Walter Phillimore, Bart	Appeal dismissed	Supreme Court of Canada
The Fidelity and Casualty Insurance Company of New York v. Frederick W. Mitchell	[1917] UKPC 68	"The plaintiff in this case sues on an accident policy date the 10th February, 1913."	Viscount Haldane; **Lord Dunedin**; Lord Shaw; Sir Arthur Channell	Appeal dismissed	Supreme Court of Ontario (Appellate Division)
Vancouver Power Company (Limited) v. The Corporation of the District of North Vancouver	[1917] UKPC 69	"This appeal is brought from a judgment of the Court of Appeal of British Columbia, dated the 4th April, 1916, dismissing an appeal by the appellants against the judgment of Mr. Justice Murphy, dated the 29th June, 1915. The respondents, the Corporation of the District of North Vancouver, are a municipality incorporated under the Municipal Act of the Province of British Columbia. On the 16th August, 1905, they entered into an agreement with the appellants, the Vancouver Power Company (Limited), granting to the latter power for the construction, maintenance, and operation, within the limits of the district, of all the works, power-houses, building, poles, and wires required 'for the generation, distribution, and sale of electricity for light, heat, and power, and any other purpose'."	Viscount Haldane; Lord Dunedin; **Lord Shaw**; Lord Sumner	Appeal dismissed	Court of Appeal of British Columbia
Canadian Northern Pacific Railway Company v. The Corporation of the City of New Westminster	[1917] UKPC 75	"This appeal raises the question whether certain lands belongings to the appellants (the Canadian Northern Pacific Railway Company) and within the City of New Westminster, in the Province of British Columbia, are exempt from taxation by the respondents, the Corporation of that city. The Court of Appeal of British Columbia has held that whatever may be the case after the appellants have deposited plans pursuant to Section 17 of the British Columbia Railway Act, 1911 (cap. 194), and have got such plans approved by the Minister, at all events the lands in question are not exempt until such plans have been so deposited and have been so approved. That has not been done yet. From that decision the present appeal is brought."	Viscount Haldane; Lord Dunedin; **Sir Arthur Channell**	Appeal dismissed	Court of Appeal of British Columbia
Pacific Coast Coal Mines (Limited) and Others v. John Arbuthnot and Others	[1917] UKPC 76	"This is an appeal from a judgment of the Court of Appeal of British Columbia, which reversed the judgment of Mr. Justice Clement, who tried the action. The proceedings were brought by the appellants as plaintiffs to set aside a trust-deed dated the 1st March, 1911, made between the appellants and the respondents, the British American Trust Company (Limited), for securing payment of 1,500 debentures of 1,000 dollars each, carrying interest at 6 percent., and the debentures issued thereunder, and also to recover from certain of the respondents secret profits alleged to have been made by them as vendors to and promoters of the appellant Company."	**Viscount Haldane**; Lord Dunedin; Lord Sumner	Appeal allowed	British Columbia Court of Appeal
The Toronto Railway Company v. The King and others	[1917] UKPC 77	"This is an appeal, for which special leave was given, from a judgment of the Court of Appeal for Ontario. The question is whether the appellants were properly found guilty on an indictment for having failed, in breach of an alleged legal duty, to take reasonable precautions to avoid undue dangerous and illegal overcrowding of passengers in their tramway cars, whereby the property and comfort of the public, as passengers in these cars, were endangered."	**Viscount Haldane**; Lord Dunedin; Lord Atkinson; Lord Parker of Waddington; Lord Parmoor; Lord Wrenbury; Sir Arthur Channell	Appeal allowed	Supreme Court of Ontario (Appellate Division)
The Westholme Lumber Company (Limited) v. The Corporation of the City of Victoria and Others	[1917] UKPC 81	"The appellants carry on business as contractors in the Province of British Columbia, and in December 1911 they undertook the construction of a waterworks system between Sooke Lake and the City of Victoria in that province, a distance of about 20 miles. The contract is expressed in writing."	Lord Parker of Waddington; **Lord Strathclyde**; Sir Walter Phillimore, Bart	Appeal dismissed	British Columbia Court of Appeal
The Canada National Fire Insurance Company v. Hutchings and another: The Great West Permanent Loan Company v. Hutchings and another	[1918] UKPC 3	"The first-mentioned action is brought by transferor and transferee of a parcel of fully paid-up shares in the Company against the Insurance Company; the second action is also a joint action by two transferors and the transferee of two parcels of fully paid-up shares in the Company against the Loan Company."	Lord Parker of Waddington; Lord Sumner; **Sir Walter Phillimore, Bart**	Appeal dismissed	Court of Appeal of Manitoba
James Gibb and another v. The King	[1918] UKPC 61	"The main question upon this appeal is as to the existence and extent of the right of the appellants to obtain from the Crown either compensation of damages for land originally appropriated by the Crown for purposes of public improvement, and subsequently abandoned and revested in the appellants."	Earl Loreburn; **Lord Buckmaster**; Lord Sumner	Appeal allowed	Supreme Court of Canada
William Egbert and others v. The Northern Crown Bank	[1918] UKPC 70	"The respondents are a Bank having a branch at Calgary, in the province of Alberta. The appellants are the surviving signatories and the executors of one deceased signatory, whose name was Breckenridge, to a letter of guarantee executed in favour of the Bank. The guarantee was given to secure the advances made and to be made to a company called Woodcrafts (Limited) of which the guarantors were directors."	Lord Buckmaster; **Lord Dunedin**; Lord Atkinson	Appeal dismissed	Supreme Court of Alberta (Appeal Division)
British Columbia Express Company v. Grand Trunk Pacific Railway Company	[1918] UKPC 80	"In the view their Lordships take of this case, the only question that arises for determination is whether a bridge built by the Grand Trunk Pacific Railway Company (who are respondents on the appeal) over the Fraser River in the Cariboo District of British Columbia, known as Dome Creek Bridge, Mile 142, caused such special and peculiar injury to the appellants as to entitle them to maintain an action for an injunction and recovery of damages against the respondents."	Viscount Finlay, Lord Chancellor; **Lord Buckmaster**; Lord Atkinson	Appeal dismissed	Supreme Court of Canada
Canada Foundry Company, Limited v. Edmonton Portland Cement Company	[1918] UKPC 83	"This is an appeal from the judgment of the Supreme Court of Alberta, Appellate Division (Hyndman, J., dissenting as to the amount and principle of allowance of damages), dismissing an appeal taken by the appellants from the judgment of the trial Judge, Mr. Justice Walsh, given on the 4th November, 1915, who awarded to the respondent the sum of 10,000 dollars damages for breach of contract by the appellants."	Viscount Finlay, Lord Chancellor; Lord Buckmaster; **Lord Atkinson**	Appeal dismissed	Supreme Court of Alberta (Appellate Division)
Dominion Trust Company v. New York Life Insurance Company and others	[1918] UKPC 84	"These actions were raised in the Supreme Court of British Columbia by the Dominion Trust Company in liquidation and its liquidator as executors of the deceased W.R. Arnold against three insurance companies with whom Arnold had effectuated policies on his life."	Viscount Finlay, Lord Chancellor; Lord Buckmaster; **Lord Dunedin**; Lord Atkinson	Appeal allowed	Court of Appeal of British Columbia
Foley Brothers and others v. James A McIlwee and others	[1918] UKPC 93	"In 1913 the Canadian Pacific Railway Company were in the course of laying a double track railway-line from Glacier to Bear Creek in British Columbia, and on the 30th June, 1913, they entered into a contract with the appellants, who carry on the business of railway contractors, whereby the appellants undertook the construction on the line."	**Lord Buckmaster**; Lord Dunedin; Lord Atkinson	Appeal allowed in part	Court of Appeal of British Columbia
The Minister of Justice for the Dominion of Canada v. The City of Levis	[1918] UKPC 97	"This is an appeal by special leave, by an Order in Council of 27th November, 1917, from a judgment of the Superior Court of Quebec in review, affirming a judgment of the Superior Court of Quebec, which dismissed a petition of the appellant for an order of mandamus against the respondents."	Lord Sumner; **Lord Parmoor**; Lord Wrenbury	Appeal dismissed	Quebec Superior Court
The Ship "Borghild" v. James D'Entremont and others	[1919] UKPC 20	"This is an appeal from a judgment of the Supreme Court of Canada affirming a decision of the Judge of the Exchequer Court of Canada, Nova Scotia Admiralty District, in three consolidated actions brought against the S.S. 'Borghild' for damages arising out of a collision between that vessel and the fishing schooner 'Oriole'. As a result of the collision the 'Oriole' and her cargo were sunk and five of her crew drowned."	Lord Sumner; Lord Parmoor; Lord Wrenbury; **Lord Sterndale**; Sir Arthur Channell	Appeal allowed in part	Supreme Court of Canada
The British America Elevator Company Limited v. The Bank of British North America	[1919] UKPC 29	"The Court of Appeal for the Province of Manitoba varied a judgment of Mr. Justice Galt delivered in this case in favour of the appellants (the plaintiffs) for $15,218. The Court of Appeal substituted for this judgment an inquiry as to what loss the appellants had sustained by reason of certain drafts set out in the statement of claim having been credited in the books of the respondent Bank to the account of one Youngberg or to the account of the firm of Youngberg and Vassie."	**Viscount Haldane**; Viscount Finlay; Lord Phillimore	Appeal allowed	Court of Appeal of Manitoba
The Electrical Development Company of Ontario Limited v. The Attorney General of Ontario and others	[1919] UKPC 31	"The question in this case is whether the Writ of Summons in the action was properly set aside. The action is one which raises questions as to the right to use the water of the Niagara River for the purpose of generating electricity."	Viscount Haldane; **Viscount Finlay**; Viscount Cave; Lord Shaw; Lord Phillimore	Appeal allowed	Ontario Supreme Court (Appellate Division)
The Toronto General Trusts Corporation v. The King	[1919] UKPC 32	"This is an appeal by the administrator with the will annexed of Richard Grigg, deceased, from a judgment of the Supreme Court of Canada, affirming a judgment of the Supreme Court of the Province of Alberta, Appellate Division, which in its turn affirmed a judgment of Mr. Justice Hyndman upon a special case submitted to him. The effect of the judgments under appeal was to declare that certain mortgages secured upon land in the Province of Alberta which were held by the testator, who was domiciled and died in the Province of Ontario, were subject to succession duty in the Province of Alberta, and the question raised by this appeal is whether they were in fact so subject."	Viscount Haldane; Viscount Finlay; **Viscount Cave**; Lord Dunedin; Lord Shaw	Appeal dismissed	Supreme Court of Canada
Angus G. Creelman and another v. The Hudson Bay Insurance Company	[1919] UKPC 54	"On the 30th December, 1911, the appellants entered into an agreement to buy from the respondents certain land in Vancouver. The agreement is said to be antedated, but into this and the other circumstances which led to the agreement being made their Lordships do not think it is necessary to enquire. The terms of the agreement provided for payment of the purchase price in certain installments, and threw upon the appellants the duty of discharging an existing mortgage upon the property."	**Lord Buckmaster**; Lord Parmoor; Lord Wrenbury	Appeal dismissed	Court of Appeal of British Columbia
Edgar Stanley Walker v. Catherine Walker and The Attorney General for the Province of Manitoba	[1919] UKPC 58	"The question to be decided in this case is one of much importance, and is of a class as to which their Lordships always desire that, before any topic falling within it is brought before them on appeal, that topic should have previously been submitted for consideration by the Supreme Court of Canada. However, in bringing the appeal directly from the Court of Appeal in the Province the appellant is within his legal right, and it becomes the duty of this Board to dispose of the question raised. That question is whether the Court of King's Bench for the Province of Manitoba has jurisdiction to deal with a petition for a decree declaring a marriage null and void on the ground of impotency. The answer to this question depends on what is the law relating to dissolution of marriage in the Province, and to the jurisdiction of its Court of King's Bench."	**Viscount Haldane**; Lord Buckmaster; Lord Dunedin; Lord Shaw; Lord Scott Dickson	Appeal dismissed	Court of Appeal of Manitoba
Mary Board v. William Board and The Attorney General for the Province of Alberta	[1919] UKPC 59	"This is an appeal from a judgment of the Supreme Court of Alberta, by which it was held that there was jurisdiction in the Court to entertain proceedings on a petition for divorce on the ground of adultery."	**Viscount Haldane**; Lord Buckmaster; Lord Dunedin; Lord Shaw; Lord Scott Dickson	Appeal dismissed	Supreme Court of Alberta (Appellate Division)
In the matter of the "Initiative and Referendum Act," being Chapter 59 of the Acts of Legislative Assembly of Manitoba, 6 George V.	[1919] UKPC 60	"In this case questions were raised in the Province of Manitoba as to the validity of an Act passed by its Legislature and entitled the Initiative and Referendum Act. In consequence, under a Statute which enabled him to do so, the Lieutenant-Governor in Council referred to the Court of King's Bench of the Province the two questions which follow:–1. Had the Legislative Assembly jurisdiction to enact the said Act, and, if not, in what particular or respect has it exceeded its power? 2. Had the Legislative Assembly jurisdiction to enact sections 3, 4, 4a, 7, 8, 11, 12, 17 (subsection 1) of the said Act, or any of them; and, of so, which of them?"	**Viscount Haldane**; Lord Buckmaster; Lord Dunedin; Lord Shaw; Lord Scott Dickson	Appeal dismissed	Court of Appeal of Manitoba
The Steel Company of Canada Limited v. The Dominion Radiator Company Limited	[1919] UKPC 65	"In this case their Lordships find themselves in agreement with the view taken both by the Trial Judge and by the Appellate Division. They hold the view that the case is particularly clear, and under those circumstances adopt the course of stating shortly, and without consideration, the reasons which have led them to that conclusion. ... The action was brought to recover damages for alleged breaches of two contracts for the sale of, and delivery by, the appellants to the respondents of pig-iron; the first dated the 23rd December 1915, for 1,000 tons, and the second dated the 25th September, 1916, for 1,200 tons."	**Earl of Birkenhead, Lord Chancellor**; Viscount Haldane; Lord Buckmaster; Lord Parmoor; Mr. Justice Duff	Appeal dismissed	Ontario Supreme Court (Appellate Division)
The Canada Pacific Railway Company v. David Herman	[1919] UKPC 66	"In this case the plaintiff, who was in the employment of the defendants as a train conductor, brought an action to recover damages for personal injuries."	**Earl of Birkenhead, Lord Chancellor**; Viscount Haldane; Lord Buckmaster; Lord Parmoor; Mr. Justice Duff	Appeal dismissed	Court of Appeal for Saskatchewan
American Surety Company of New York v. Calgary Milling Company, Limited	[1919] UKPC 68	"The respondent in this appeal, who are grain millers, were in need of a new elevator to replace one which had been destroyed by fire. With a view to its erection they entered into a contract, on the 18th July, 1910, with a firm of contractors called 'Tromanhauser and Mooers'."	Viscount Haldane; Lord Buckmaster; **Lord Dunedin**; Lord Shaw	Appeal dismissed	Supreme Court of Alberta (Appellate Division)
Grant Smith and Company and McDonnell, Limited v. The Seattle Construction and Dry Dock Company	[1919] UKPC 72	"Two appeals are brought in this case: the one by the appellants, seeking to reverse the judgment of the Court of Appeal of British Columbia awarding against them and in favour of the respondents the sum of $44,500, as to $10,000 for rent of a dry-dock, and as to $34,500 as damages for breach of contract; the other by the respondents asking to increase the amount awarded to the sum of $85,000, thereby restoring the judgment of the Trial Judge, who decreed that sum in their favour."	**Lord Buckmaster**; Lord Parmoor; Lord Wrenbury	Appeal dismissed	Court of Appeal of British Columbia
The Attorney General for the Dominion of Canada and others v. The Ritchie Contracting and Supply Company Limited and others	[1919] UKPC 82	"The respondents, the Ritchie Contracting and Supply Company, were, with the license of the Government of British Columbia, whose Attorney-General is the second respondent, removing sand from a bank on the foreshore of the sea known as Spanish Bank, situated at the entrance to English Bay. English Bay is the bay which forms the outer approach to Burrard Inlet, which leads to the city of Vancouver. The appellants, the Attorney-General for the Dominion of Canada and the Vancouver Harbour Commissioners, brought this action to restrain the respondents from removing the sand. The main ground on which the action was based was that English Bay was a public harbour and Spanish Bank a part thereof; that in virtue of section 108 of the British North America Act the solum of the bank belonged to the Dominion; and that the operation of the respondents thereon were consequently unauthorised and illegal."	Viscount Haldane; Lord Buckmaster; **Lord Dunedin**	Appeal dismissed	Supreme Court of Canada
The Esquimalt and Nanaimo Railway Company v. H.W. Treat	[1919] UKPC 83	"The question in this case is what is meant by the expression "coast line" in a statutory conveyance. The Courts below have unanimously held that in its context in the instrument the expression was used to indicate a boundary at high-water mark, which excluded the foreshore and the foreshore rights. Their Lordships are of opinion that the decision appealed from was right and should be affirmed."	**Viscount Haldane**; Lord Buckmaster; Lord Atkinson	Appeal dismissed	Court of Appeal of British Columbia
The Governors and Company of Adventurers of England trading into Hudson Bay v. The Council of the Rural Municipality of Bratt's Lake, No. 129; and J.E. Martin v. The Council of the Rural Municipality of Snipe Lake No. 259	[1919] UKPC 84; and [1919] UKPC 85	"These are appeals from the Court of Appeal for the Province of Saskatchewan. In the Hudson's Bay Company's appeal, there are six respondents, but the same main questions arise in each case. It is, however, argued on behalf of the appellants that somewhat different considerations are raised in the case of those rural municipalities in which the burden of the surtax falls exclusively, or almost exclusively, on the appellant Company."	Earl of Birkenhead, Lord Chancellor; Viscount Haldane; Lord Buckmaster; **Lord Parmoor**; Mr. Justice Duff	Appeal dismissed	Court of Appeal for Saskatchewan
Joseph Edouard Auger and others v. Dame Corinne H. Beaudry and others	[1919] UKPC 86	"The resolution of this dispute depends upon the true construction to be placed on the Will of Jean Louis Beaudry, who died on the 25th June, 1886. He left surviving five children, born in lawful wedlock, four daughters, viz., Corinne Herminie, who married, and is known as Mrs. R. Roy, Léocadie Corinth (alias Clorinde) Beaudry, who married Mr. Joseph Cyrille Auger, Victorine Beaudry, who married Mr. Lionel Gardiner, Malvina Beaudry, who married Mr. Edmond Starnes, and one son – Guillaume Napoléon Léonidas Beaudry. Guillaume Napoléon died without issue in 1887. The question that arises in this case is as to the disposition of the share which Mrs. Gardiner took, both original and accrued in the testator's property."	Earl of Birkenhead, Lord Chancellor; Viscount Haldane; **Lord Buckmaster**; Lord Parmoor; Mr. Justice Duff	Appeal dismissed	Quebec Court of King's Bench (Appeal Side)
The Workmen's Compensation Board v Canadian Pacific Railway Company	[1919] UKPC 87	"This is an appeal from a judgment of the Court of Appeal of British Columbia dismissing, McPhillips, J.A. dissenting, an appeal from the judgment of Clement, J. in an action. That judgment declared that the enactment of the Workmen's Compensation Act of the Province, in so far as it purported to warrant the payment of compensation by the defendants, who are the appellants here, to the dependents of certain members of the crew of the steamship "Princess Sophia", which foundered with all hands in waters outside British territory on a return journey from Skagway in Alaska to Vancouver, was ultra vires of the Legislature of the Province."	Earl of Birkenhead, Lord Chancellor; **Viscount Haldane**; Lord Buckmaster; Lord Parmoor; Mr. Justice Duff	Appeal allowed	Court of Appeal of British Columbia
Angus Mackenzie and others v. Bing Kee	[1919] UKPC 88	"This is an appeal from the decision of the Court of Appeal of the Province of British Columbia, dated the 1st April, 1919, reversing the decision of Mr. Justice Gregory of the Supreme Court of that Province, dated the 30th May, 1918."	Earl of Birkenhead, Lord Chancellor; Viscount Haldane; Lord Buckmaster; **Lord Atkinson**; Mr. Justice Duff	Appeal dismissed	Court of Appeal of British Columbia
The Esquimalt and Nanaimo Railway Company v. The Granby Consolidated Mining, Smelting and Power Company, Limited	[1919] UKPC 89	"This is an appeal from the order dated the 1st April, 1919, of the Court of Appeal of British Columbia, allowing an appeal from an order dated the 17th June, 1918, of Mr. Justice Macdonald, whereby he ordered that the petition of the respondent should be dismissed."	Viscount Haldane; Lord Buckmaster; **Lord Atkinson**; Mr. Justice Duff	Appeal allowed	Court of Appeal of British Columbia
The Corporation of the Township of Richmond v. Arthur Wellsley Evans and others	[1919] UKPC 90	"This is an appeal from the judgment of the Court of Appeal for British Columbia by the Corporation of the Township of Richmond in an action in which the respondents recovered against the Corporation judgment for $5,000. The action was brought under the Families Compensation Act against the appellant Corporation as well as the Corporation of South Vancouver by the surviving husband and children of Annie Evans, whose death was alleged to have been caused by the negligence of the defendant Corporations."	Viscount Haldane; Lord Buckmaster; Lord Dunedin; **Mr. Justice Duff**	Appeal dismissed	Court of Appeal of British Columbia
The Corporation of the City of Armstrong v. The Canadian Northern Pacific Railway Company; and The Corporation of the City of Vernon v. The Canadian Northern Pacific Railway Company	[1919] UKPC 91; and [1919] UKPC 92	"This appeal raises a question concerning the construction and application of Clause 13 (E) of an agreement dated January, 1910, between the Government of British Columbia and the Canadian Northern Railway Company which was ratified by a Statute passed by the legislature of the Province (10 Edward 7, C. 4)."	Viscount Haldane; Lord Buckmaster; Lord Dunedin; **Mr. Justice Duff**	Appeal allowed	Court of Appeal of British Columbia
The Canadian Pacific Railway Company v. Denton Dale Pyne	[1919] UKPC 93	"The respondent on the 25th January, 1916, was a passenger on the appellant Company's train proceeding from Regina to Brandon by way of Bulyea and Kirkella; when passing over a switch near Kirkella the coach in which the respondent was travelling left the rails and capsized, and in consequence the respondent was severely injured."	Earl of Birkenhead, Lord Chancellor; Viscount Haldane; Lord Buckmaster; Lord Parmoor; **Mr. Justice Duff**	Appeal dismissed	Court of Appeal of Manitoba
John Mackay and Company v. The Corporation of the City of Toronto	[1919] UKPC 94	"The Appellate Division of the Supreme Court of Ontario has in this case affirmed a judgment of Middleton, J., which dismissed an action brought by the appellant to recover $42,546.50 for services alleged to have been rendered to the respondents and for disbursements in connection with such services. The appellant's firm carry on business at Toronto as accountants and advisers on business questions, and he claims to have been employed under a contract with the respondents, made by the Mayor and duly adopted and ratified by the respondents themselves, to report on a proposed purchase of the undertakings of the Toronto Electric Light Company and the Toronto Street Railway Company."	**Viscount Haldane**; Lord Buckmaster; Lord Dunedin; Mr. Justice Duff	Appeal dismissed	Ontario Supreme Court (Appellate Division)
Isaie Craig v. Dame Arzélie Lamoureux	[1919] UKPC 96	"This is an appeal from the Supreme Court of Canada, which reversed, the Chief Justice dissenting, a judgment of the Court of King's Bench for the Province of Quebec. That Court, in its turn, had reversed the judgment of the Superior Court for the Province, delivered in an action which was brought to set aside a will. The claim was made against the appellant as defendant, and was based on the contention that as the appellant, who was the husband of the testatrix, was the sole beneficiary under the will and had been instrumental in preparing it, the onus lay on him to show that he had not procured its execution by undue influence and misrepresentation and that this onus he had failed to discharge."	**Viscount Haldane**; Lord Buckmaster; Lord Dunedin	Appeal allowed	Supreme Court of Canada
Quesnel Forks Gold Mining Company, Limited v. Robert T. Ward and others	[1919] UKPC 97	"The question in this case is whether certain leases, granted by the Government of the Province of British Columbia to the Cariboo Hydraulic Mining Co., are valid and subsisting leases; or whether, as the appellants contend, the terms for which they were granted, have come to an end."	Viscount Haldane; **Lord Buckmaster**; Lord Dunedin; Mr. Justice Duff	Appeal dismissed	British Columbia Court of Appeal
The Board of Trustees of the Roman Catholic Separate Schools for the City of Ottawa v. The Quebec Bank and others and The Attorney General for the Province of Ontario	[1919] UKPC 98	"The present case is what it is to be hoped is the last chapter of the history of the unfortunate disagreement between the Board of the Roman Catholic Schools and the Educational Authority of the City of Ottawa. This matter has already been before the Board in the two cases of Trustees of the Roman Catholic Separate School for the City of Ottawa v. Mackell [1917] A.C. 62 and the Trustees of the Roman Catholic Separate Schools for the City of Ottawa v. Ottawa Corporation [1917] A.C. 76."	Viscount Haldane; Lord Buckmaster; **Lord Dunedin**; Mr. Justice Duff	Appeal dismissed	Ontario Supreme Court (Appellate Division)
Esquimalt and Nanaimo Railway Company v. Charles Wilson and Esquimalt and Nanaimo Railway Company v. Elizabeth Dunlop	[1919] UKPC 99 and [1919] UKPC 100	"The question that is raised by these appeals is a question of procedure, technical in its nature, but doubtless of great importance both to the appellants and the respondents. It is simply whether the Attorney-General can and ought to be added as defendant to proceedings in which the appellants are plaintiffs and the respondents are the defendants."	Earl of Birkenhead, Lord Chancellor; Viscount Haldane; **Lord Buckmaster**; Lord Atkinson; Mr. Justice Duff	Appeal allowed	Court of Appeal of British Columbia
The Vancouver Lumber Company v. The King	[1919] UKPC 101	"This is an appeal from a judgment of the Supreme Court of Canada, which dismissed an appeal from the Exchequer Court of that Dominion. What had been decided by the Exchequer Court was that an indenture varying the terms of a lease and purporting to have been made between Her Majesty, the then Queen, acting through the Minister of Militia and Defence in Canada, and the appellants, on the 14th April, 1900, was a nullity. "	**Viscount Haldane**; Lord Dunedin; Lord Parmoor	Appeal dismissed	Supreme Court of Canada
Canadian Pacific Railway Company v. The Steamship "Storstad" and others	[1919] UKPC 124	"This appeal arises out of the disastrous collision between the 'Storstad' and the 'Empress of Ireland,' which occurred in the St. Lawrence on the 29th May, 1914. The 'Empress of Ireland' foundered, with much loss of life; the 'Storstad' proceeded to her destination – Montreal. There she was arrested, and an action in rem was begun at the suit of the Canadian Pacific Railway Company, owners of the 'Empress of Ireland'."	Viscount Haldane; Lord Dunedin; Lord Atkinson; **Lord Sumner**	Appeal allowed	Supreme Court of Canada
Montreal Tramways Company v. Roméo Savignac	[1919] UKPC 126	"This is an appeal from a judgment of the Court of King's Bench of Quebec affirming with a modification the judgment of Mr. Justice Tellier in an action for compensation under the Workmen's Compensation Act of Quebec (Quebec R.S. 1909, Articles 7321 ff.)"	Viscount Finlay; **Viscount Cave**; Lord Sumner; Lord Parmoor	Appeal dismissed	Quebec Court of King's Bench (Appeal Side)
The Emerson-Brantingham Implement Company v. Charles J. Schofield	[1919] UKPC 129	"In this case the petition for special leave to appeal contained this averment in paragraph 6: 'The question is of importance as it affects the construction of contracts in general, especially those relating to the supply of machinery, affecting the suppliers thereof, and the large class of farmers who are purchasers of agricultural machinery'."	**Viscount Finlay**; Viscount Cave; Lord Shaw; Lord Parmoor	Appeal dismissed	Supreme Court of Canada
The Toronto Railway Company v. The Corporation of the City of Toronto	[1919] UKPC 133	"This is a case in which special leave has been obtained by the Toronto Railway Company to appeal against three orders. The first of these orders was made on the 3rd July, 1909, by the Railway Board for Canada and directed that the Toronto Railway Company should bear a certain proportion of the costs of the construction of a bridge which the Corporation was by the order authorised to construct for the purpose of carrying the highway of Queen Street East, Toronto, with the tracks thereon of the Toronto Railway Company, a Provincial railway, over the tracks of the Canadian Pacific Railway Company, the Grand Trunk Railway Company, and the Canadian Northern Railway Company, all three Dominion railways."	**Viscount Finlay**; Viscount Cave; Lord Sumner; Lord Parmoor	Appeal dismissed	Board of Railway Commissioners for Canada and the Supreme Court of Ontario
Isabella Taylor v. Robert Davies and others	[1919] UKPC 136	"This is an appeal from a judgment of the First Appellate Division of the Supreme Court of Ontario, reversing the judgment of Mr. Justice Lennox in favour of the plaintiff, and directing judgment to be entered dismissing the plaintiff's action with costs."	Viscount Finlay; **Viscount Cave**; Lord Sumner; Lord Parmoor	Appeal dismissed	Ontario Supreme Court (Appellate Division)

== Summary by year and result ==
Year	Number of Cases	Appeal Allowed		Appeal Dismissed	
1910	19	8	42.1%	11	57.9%
1911	17	6	35.3%	11	64.7%
1912	26	12	46.2%	14	53.8%
1913	19	14	73.7%	5	26.3%
1914	30	10	33.3%	20	66.7%
1915	11	6	54.5%	5	45.5%
1916 (Note: In one reference decision in this year, the Judicial Committee simply answered the questions without allowing or dismissing the appeal: Attorney General for Ontario and others v Attorney General for Canada and others, [1916] UKPC 13.)	23	9	39.1%	13	56.5%
1917	14	4	28.6%	10	71.4%
1918	8	3	37.5%	5	62.5%
1919	37	11	29.7%	26	70.3%
Total Cases	204	83	40.7%	120	58.8%
Yearly Averages	20.2	8.3		11.8	

== Summary by jurisdiction and court appealed from ==
Jurisdiction	Number of Appeals	On Appeal from Supreme Court of Canada		On Appeal from Other Courts	
Federal	19	18	94.7%	1	5.3%
Ontario	63	13	20.6%	50	79.4%
Quebec	37	10	27.0%	27	73.9%
Nova Scotia	8	5	62.5%	3	37.5%
New Brunswick	1	1	100.0%	0	0.0%
Manitoba	13	1	7.7%	12	92.3%
British Columbia	47	6	12.8%	41	87.2%
Prince Edward Island	0	0	0.0%	0	0.0%
Saskatchewan	5	2	40.0%	3	60.0%
Alberta	11	3	27.3%	8	72.7%
Northwest Territories	0	0	0.0%	0	0.0%
Yukon	0	0	0.0%	0	0.0%
Total	204	59	28.9%	145	71.1%

== See also ==
- List of Canadian appeals to the Judicial Committee of the Privy Council, 1867–1869
- List of Canadian appeals to the Judicial Committee of the Privy Council, 1870–1879
- List of Canadian appeals to the Judicial Committee of the Privy Council, 1880–1889
- List of Canadian appeals to the Judicial Committee of the Privy Council, 1890–1899
- List of Canadian appeals to the Judicial Committee of the Privy Council, 1900–1909
- List of Canadian appeals to the Judicial Committee of the Privy Council, 1920–1929
- List of Canadian appeals to the Judicial Committee of the Privy Council, 1930–1939
- List of Canadian appeals to the Judicial Committee of the Privy Council, 1940–1949
- List of Canadian appeals to the Judicial Committee of the Privy Council, 1950–1959

== Sources ==
- British and Irish Legal Information Institute: Privy Council Decisions
- 1910 Privy Council Decisions
- 1911 Privy Council Decisions
- 1912 Privy Council Decisions
- 1913 Privy Council Decisions
- 1914 Privy Council Decisions
- 1915 Privy Council Decisions
- 1916 Privy Council Decisions
- 1917 Privy Council Decisions
- 1918 Privy Council Decisions
- 1919 Privy Council Decisions
