= William Fry Channell =

Sir William Fry Channell (31 August 1804 – 26 February 1873) was a judge and Baron of the Exchequer.

== Early life ==
Channell was born in Bermondsey, then in Surrey, on 31 August 1804 to Pike and Mary Channell. His father was from Devon and had served in the Royal Navy under Admiral Nelson during the Battle of Copenhagen (1801). Channell's only education was at private schools and later in life he often complained about his lack of a formal education.

== Career ==
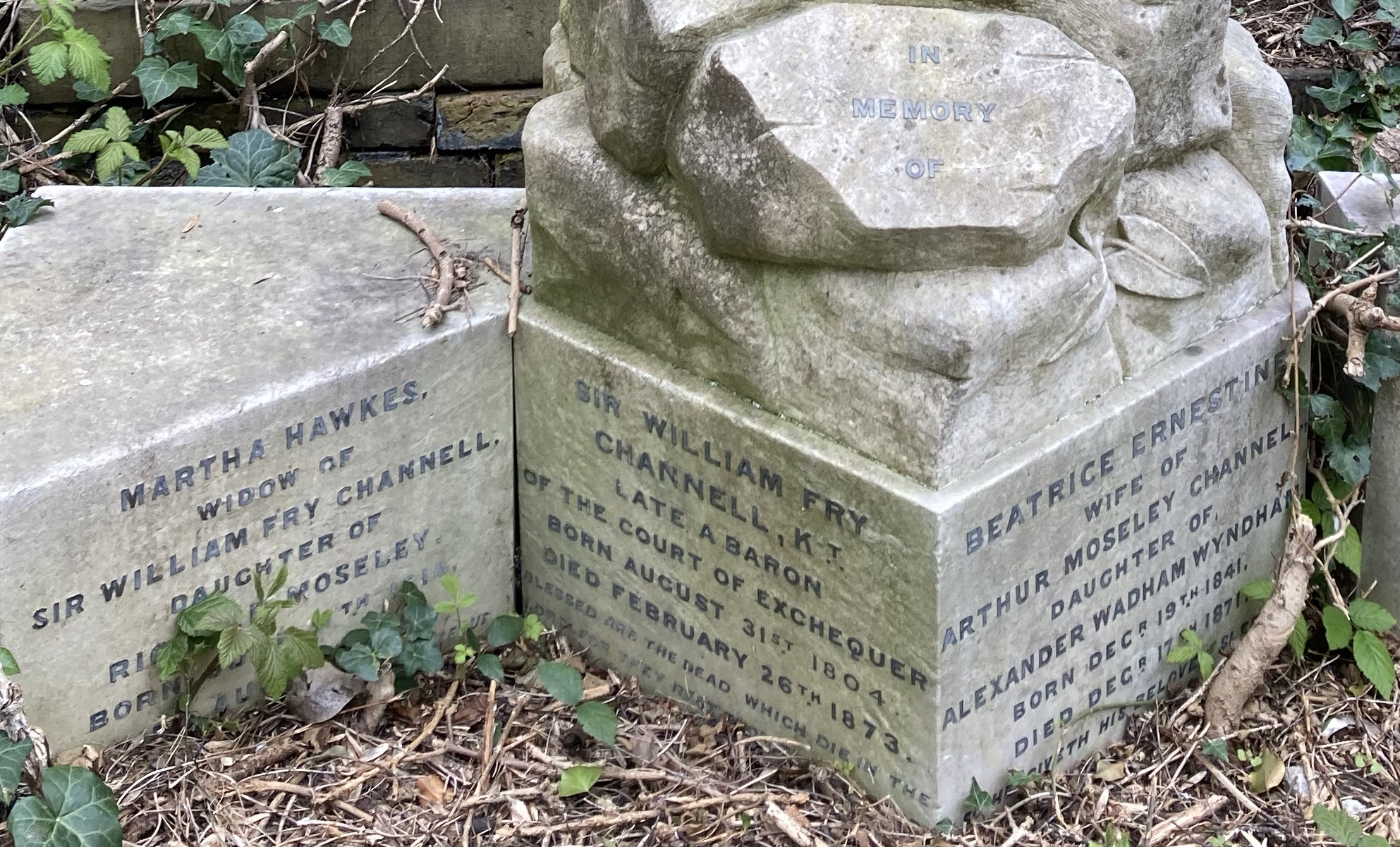
The Grave of William Fry Channell in Highgate Cemetery

He joined the Inner Temple and was called to the bar in 1827. He built a successful practice in Surrey and Home circuits, joining the order of Serjeants-at-law in 1840, leading the court with Serjeant Talfourd until 1846, when serjeants lost their monopoly of audience. In 1844, when Sir Frederic Thesiger became solicitor-general, Channell received a patent of precedence and later led the Home circuit.

In 1857 he was appointed by Lord Chancellor Cranworth to succeed Baron Alderson as a Baron of the Exchequer in the Court of Exchequer, and was knighted. He served until January 1873 when severe asthma forced his resignation. He died a month later, on 26 February 1873, at his home, 2 Clarendon Place, Hyde Park Gardens and was buried in a family grave on the western side of Highgate Cemetery.

== Personal life ==
He married Martha Hawkes in 1834 and they had a son, Arthur Moseley Channell (1838–1928), who was a noted rower and High Court judge, a daughter, Gertrude, and two other children, who died in infancy.

== Arms ==
Coat of arms of William Fry Channell

Notes
Granted 18 May 1837 by Bigland (Garter) and Woods (Clarenceux).
Crest
In front of a bugle horn Sable a buck’s head couped Argent attired Or gorged with a collar nebulee Azure.
Escutcheon
Argent a fess nebulée Azure between two lions passant Gules.
Motto
Quo Labor Et Mens Pura Vehunt

== Sources ==
- Dictionary of National Biography: Channell, Sir William Fry (1804–1873) by John Andrew Hamilton, revised by Hugh Mooney
