= Arthur Channell =

English rower and judge (1838–1928)

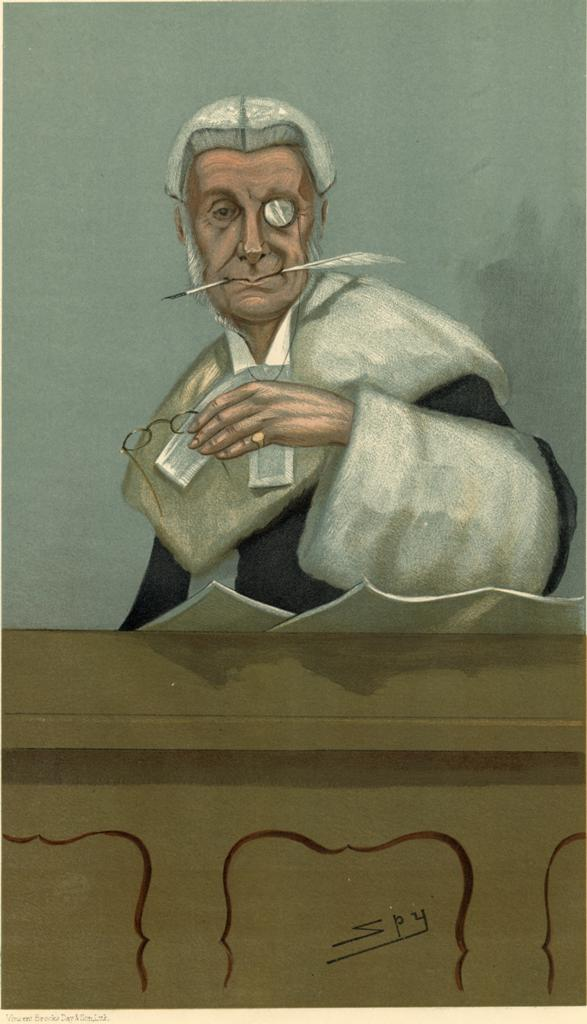
Channell in Vanity Fair

Sir Arthur Moseley Channell (13 November 1838 – 4 October 1928) was an English rower and High Court judge.

== Early life ==
Channell was the son of William Fry Channell of Hyde Park Gardens, who was later Baron Channell, of the Court of Exchequer. He was educated at Harrow School and admitted to Trinity College, Cambridge on 24 October 1856. A noted oarsman, Channell won the Colquhoun sculls in 1860.

In 1861, he won the Magdalene Silver Oars. With First Trinity Boat Club he won the Grand Challenge Cup and Ladies' Challenge Plate at Henley Royal Regatta. He was runner up in Silver Goblets and lost the Wyfold Challenge Cup to Woodgate's Brasenose crew.

== Legal career ==
Channell was admitted at the Inner Temple on 24 January 1859 and was called to the bar in 1863. He specialized in local government work, and while his career did not progress rapidly, he became Queen's Counsel in 1885. Channell was Recorder of Rochester and also a member of the Council of Legal Education from 1888 to 1897. He became a bencher in 1891 and was vice-chairman of the General Council of the Bar from 1896 to 1897. He was knighted in 1897 when he became a Judge of the High Court, initially being selected for the Commercial Court despite having little background in that area.

He tried Richard Archer Prince for the murder of the actor William Terriss in 1898. The jury found Prince guilty but insane, and he was sent to Broadmoor Criminal Lunatic Asylum. He also tried the Stratton Brothers case in 1905.

In 1914 he retired and was sworn of the Privy Council. He was a member of the Judicial Committee of the Privy Council Prize Court Appeals from 1916 to 1921, where he was involved in the case of the German hospital ship Ophelia.

== Personal life ==
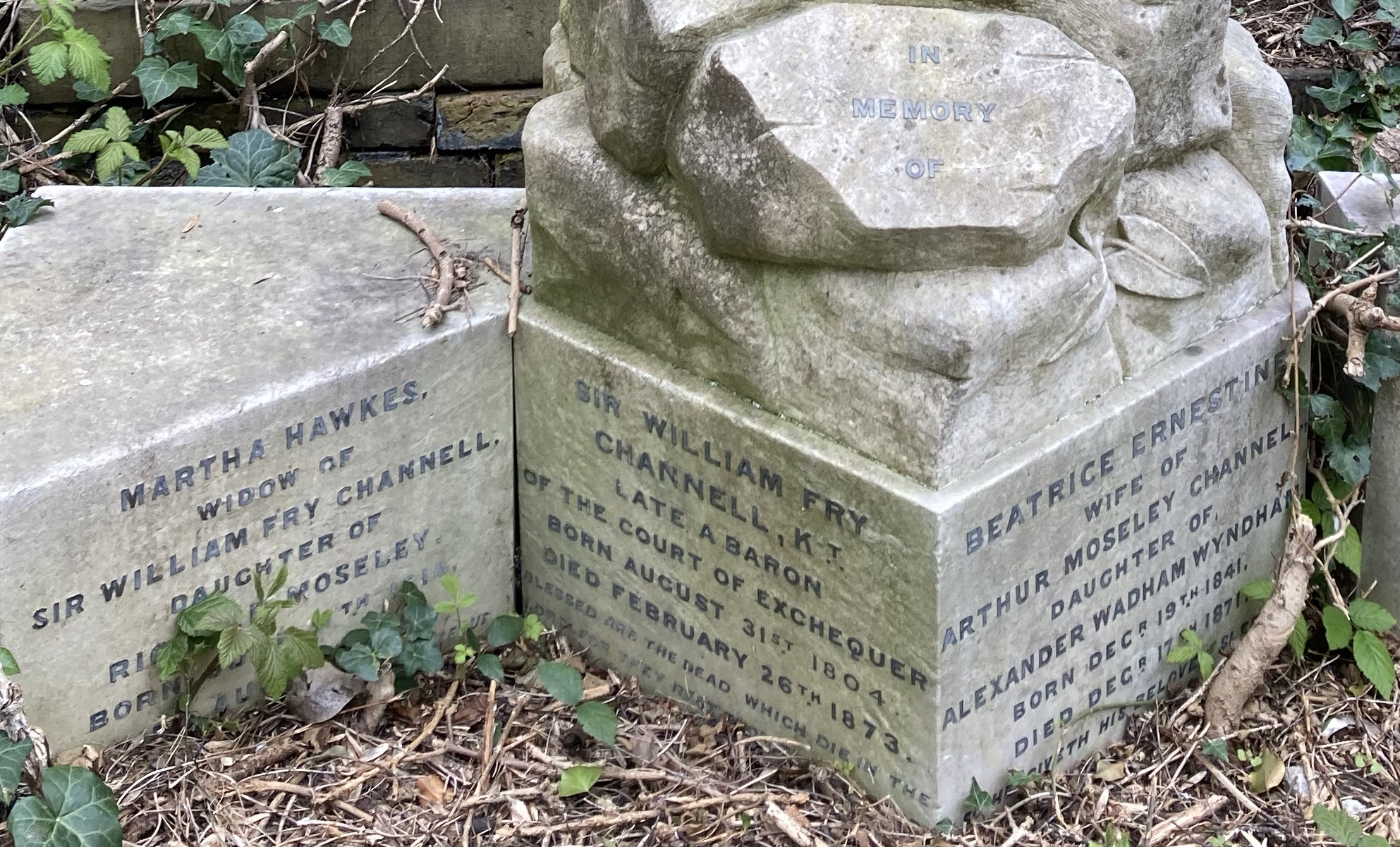
The Channell family grave in Highgate Cemetery

In 1865 Channell married Beatrice Ernestine, daughter of Captain Alexander Wadham Wyndham; they had a son and two daughters. Beatrice died in 1871. In 1877 he married Constance Helena, daughter of the barrister Walter Blackett Trevelyan, they had four sons and a daughter.

Channell was an experienced yachtsman and lived at Falmouth, Cornwall. He died there aged 89.
