= John Hamilton, 1st Viscount Sumner =

British lawyer and judge

The Right Honourable The Viscount Sumner GCB PC
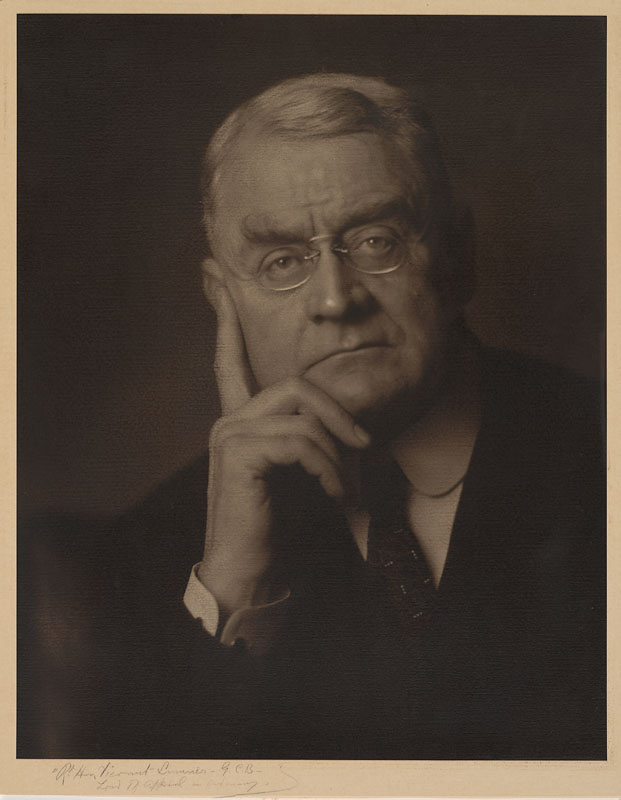
- Contemporary photograph of Lord Sumner by Walter Thomas

Personal details
- Born: 3 February 1859 Chorlton-upon-Medlock, Lancashire
- Died: 24 May 1934 (aged 75)
- Spouse: Maude Margaret Todd (m. 1892)
- Education: Balliol College, Oxford

John Andrew Hamilton, 1st Viscount Sumner, GCB, PC (3 February 1859 – 24 May 1934) was a British lawyer and judge. He was appointed a judge of the High Court of Justice (King's Bench Division) in 1909, a Lord Justice of Appeal in 1912 and a Lord of Appeal in Ordinary (Law Lord) in 1913. Created a life peer as Baron Sumner in 1913, he was further honoured when he was granted a hereditary peerage as Viscount Sumner in 1927.

== Background and education ==
Hamilton was born in Chorlton-upon-Medlock, Lancashire, the second son of Andrew Hamilton, an iron merchant of Manchester, and his wife, Frances, daughter of Joseph Sumner. He was baptised at the Church of St Wilfrid, Northenden.

Hamilton was educated at Manchester Grammar School and Balliol College, Oxford. In 1883, he was called to the bar, Inner Temple. Hamilton was a Fellow of Magdalen College, Oxford, for seven years from 1892 and was nominated an honorary fellow in 1909. He received an Honorary Doctorate of Laws by the University of Edinburgh in 1913 and by the University of Manchester in 1919. One year later, Hamilton obtained also an Honorary Doctorate of Civil Law by the University of Oxford.

== Judicial career ==
Hamilton joined in the Northern Circuit and became a King's Counsel in 1901. He was elected a standing counsel to Oxford University in 1906, a post he held for the next three years. On his appointment as Judge of the High Court of Justice (King's Bench Division) in 1909, he was knighted and invested a bencher. In 1912 he became a Lord Justice of Appeal and sworn of the Privy Council. Already in the following year, Hamilton became a Lord of Appeal in Ordinary and created a life peer as Baron Sumner, of Ibstone, in the County of Buckingham. He was further honoured, when on 31 January 1927, he created a hereditary peerage as Viscount Sumner, of Ibstone, in the County of Buckingham. Hamilton retired as judge in 1930.

== Further career ==
In 1908, Hamilton was Inspector in the Swansea Education Dispute. In the House of Lords, he was chairman of the Working Classes Cost of Living, the British Cellulose Enquiry and the British and Foreign Legal Procedure committees. Hamilton took part in the British Empire Delegation to the Paris Peace Conference as a specialist on legal questions. He subsequently helped draft the Treaty of Versailles as part of the reparations commission, for which he was appointed a Knight Grand Cross of the Order of the Bath (GCB) in the 1920 Birthday Honours. In the next year, he chaired the Royal Commission on Compensation for Suffering and Damage by Enemy Action.

== Family and legacy ==
In 1892, he married Maude Margaret Todd, the second daughter of Reverend John Wood Todd, a Baptist minister who with his wife founded what became Tudor Hall School. Hamilton's marriage was childless, and with Hamilton's death, the viscountcy became extinct.

In 2009, a biography of Lord Sumner was published by Antony Lentin.

== Arms ==
Coat of arms of John Hamilton, 1st Viscount Sumner
Coronet That of a Viscount. Crest A Deer Hound's Head couped at the neck Argent charged with two Chevrons as in the Arms Escutcheon Ermine a Chevron interlaced with another reversed between three Cinquefoils Gules Motto Loi et loyaute (French: 'Law and Loyalty')

== Famous judgements ==
- Bowman v The Secular Society (1917)
- Elder Dempster & Co v Paterson Zochonis & Co (1924)

Peerage of the United Kingdom
New creation	Viscount Sumner; 1927–1934	Extinct
