= List of Canadian appeals to the Judicial Committee of the Privy Council, 1900–1909 =

List of Canadian appeals to the JCPC (1900–1909)

This page lists all appeals to the Judicial Committee of the Privy Council from the Canadian courts, decided in the years 1900 to 1909.

From 1867 to 1949, the JCPC was the highest court of appeal for Canada (and, separately, for Newfoundland). During this period, its decisions on Canadian appeals were binding precedent on all Canadian courts, including the Supreme Court of Canada. Any decisions from this era that the Supreme Court of Canada has not overruled since gaining appellate supremacy in 1949 remain good law, and continue to bind all Canadian courts other than the Supreme Court.

The Parliament of Canada abolished appeals to the JCPC of criminal cases in 1933 and civil cases in 1949. Ongoing cases that had begun before those dates remained appealable to the JCPC. The final JCPC ruling on a Canadian case was rendered in 1959, in Ponoka-Calmar Oils v Wakefield.

== Case list ==
Case Name	Citation	Subject (Exact Text from Judgment)	Judges (Author of decision in Bold)	Appeal Allowed or Dismissed	On Appeal from
Wentworth v. Mathieu	[1900] UKPC 5	"The question in this Appeal arises upon an Act of the Legislature of Canada 27 and 28 Vict. cap 18 commonly called the 'Temperance Act of 1864.' Section 12 of this Act prohibits the sale of any spirituous or other intoxicating liquor unless it be for exclusively medicinal or sacramental purposes or bonâ fide use in some art, trade, or manufacture."	Lord Hobhouse; Lord Davey; Lord Robertson; **Sir Richard Couch**	Appeal allowed	Quebec Superior Court
Eddy v. Eddy et vir	[1900] UKPC 16	"The Appellant in this case is a gentleman residing at Hull in the Province of Quebec. The Respondent who resides in the same place is his only child. She is married to a Mr. Bessey who is a formal party to the litigation, but the spouses are separate as regards property, and she is substantially the sole Respondent."	**Lord Hobhouse**; Lord Morris; Lord Davey; Sir Richard Couch	Appeal dismissed	Quebec Court of Queen's Bench (Appeal Side)
Forget and another v. Baxter	[1900] UKPC 20	"The Appeal is from a judgment of the Court of Queen's Bench in the Province of Quebec affirming a judgment of the Court of Review which reversed a judgment of the Superior Court in an action brought by the Appellants against the Respondent."	Lord Watson; Lord Hobhouse; Sir Edward Fry; **Sir Henry Strong, CJC**	Appeal allowed	Quebec Court of Queen's Bench (Appeal Side)
Beaudry v. Bardean	[1900] UKPC 51	"These are two Appeals from a judgment of the Court of Queen's Bench dismissing Appeals by the same parties from the original judgment of the Superior Court. The action instituted by the Appellant Jean Charles Victor Beaudry of his father Victor Beaudry to recover $3,000 being the first half-yearly payment of an annuity of $6,000 bequeathed to him by the will in question."	Lord Hobhouse; Lord Macnaghten; Lord Lindley; Sir Richard Couch; **Sir Henry Strong, CJC**	Appeal dismissed	Quebec Court of Queen's Bench (Appeal Side)
The Montreal Gas Company v. Vasey	[1900] UKPC 52	"On the 15th December 1886 the Appellants entered into a contract with the Respondent for the sale to him of ammoniacal liquor produced by them in their manufacture of gas by the terms of which the Appellants agreed to deliver to the Respondent during a period of five years from the 1st of May 1887 all the ammoniacal liquor they should manufacture at their works."	Lord Hobhouse; Lord Macnaghten; Lord Lindley; Sir Richard Couch; **Sir Henry Strong, CJC**	Appeal allowed in part	Quebec Court of Queen's Bench (Appeal Side)
La Banque D'Hochelga v. Archibald W. Stevenson	[1900] UKPC 54	"In this distribution of the estate of one Lefebvre an insolvent proprietor the Appellants the Bank of Hochelaga in right of a firm of builders and suppliers of materials claims priority over the insolvent's general creditors. Their claim is put in two ways. They rely in the first place on the transfer of a builder's privilege registered against the insolvent's immovables. In the event of that claim failing they fall back on the hypothecary privilege conferred on suppliers of materials by the articles of the Civil Code now in force."	Lord Hobhouse; **Lord Macnaghten**; Lord Lindley; Sir Richard Couch; Sir Henry Strong, CJC	Appeal dismissed	Quebec Court of Queen's Bench (Appeal Side)
Livingstone v. Ross	[1901] UKPC 2	"The Appellant Livingstone, who is described in his case as an accountant of modest means, but enjoying the confidence of financial men, obtained a judgment against the Respondent Ross in the Superior Court of the city of Quebec, declaring that he was entitled as purchaser to a conveyance from Ross of the Buckingham property hereinafter described. Ross was the surviving partner of the firm of Ross Brothers, who were owners of that and other property; and Ross was winding up the business of that firm."	Lord Hobhouse; Lord Robertson; Lord Lindley; **Sir Ford North**	Appeal dismissed	Quebec Court of Queen's Bench (Appeal Side)
The Toronto Railway Company v. The Corporation of the City of Toronto	[1901] UKPC 48	The controversy between the parties to this appeal has sprung out of a deed of agreement bearing date the 1st of September 1891, made between the Plaintiffs below who are now Respondents, and the Defendants below who are now Appellants, and confirmed by an Act of the Legislature of Ontario 55 Vict. cap. 99. By it the Plaintiffs grant to the Defendants certain street railways in Toronto and other property upon the terms specified. The parties have disagreed as to the meaning of those terms in many respects; but there remain now only three points on which the Defendants contend that the judgment of the Court of Appeal ought to be varied.	**Lord Hobhouse**; Lord Davey; Lord Robertson; Sir Richard Couch	Appeal dismissed	Court of Appeal for Ontario
Burland and others v. Earle and others	[1901] UKPC 49	"The Appellants and Respondents in these two Appeals which have been consolidated are alike shareholders in a joint stock company called the British American Bank Note Company. In this judgment the term 'Appellants' will mean the Appellants in the first and principal Appeal who are Defendants in the action and 'Respondents' will mean the Respondents in the same Appeal and Plaintiffs in the action."	Lord Hobhouse; **Lord Davey**; Lord Robertson; Sir Richard Couch	Appeal allowed in part	Court of Appeal for Ontario
The Attorney General for the Province of Manitoba v. The Manitoba Licence Holders Association	[1901] UKPC 52	"In July 1900 an Act was passed by the Legislature of Manitoba for the suppression of the liquor traffic in that Province. The Act which is known by its short title of 'The Liquor Act' was to have come into operation on the 1st of June 1901. Before that date on a reference under Chapter 28 of the Revised Statutes of Manitoba the Court of King's Bench pronounced the whole Act to be unconstitutional. From this decision the present Appeal has been brought."	Lord Hobhouse; **Lord Macnaghten**; Lord Davey; Lord Robertson; Lord Lindley	Appeal allowed in part	Manitoba Court of King's Bench
The Canadian Pacific Railway Company v. Roy	[1901] UKPC 63	"This is an Appeal by the Canadian Pacific Railway Company against a judgment of the Court of Queen's Bench for Lower Canada affirming a judgment of the Superior Court of Quebec whereby that Company were held to be liable to damages to the extent of $300 for injuries to the Plaintiff's property alleged to be caused and now admitted to have been caused by sparks escaping from one of their locomotive engines while employed in the ordinary use of its railway."	**Earl of Halsbury, Lord Chancellor**; Lord Macnaghten; Lord Shand; Lord Davey; Lord Robertson; Lord Lindley; Sir Ford North	Appeal allowed	Quebec Court of King's Bench (Appeal Side)
The Hull Electric Company v. The Ottawa Electric Company and the Corporation of the City of Hull	[1902] UKPC 7	"In March 1887 Ahearn and Soper applied to the Mayor and Aldermen of the City of Hull stating that they had organised a Company for the purpose of supplying the City with electric light and asking for permission to erect their poles in the streets."	**Lord Macnaghten**; Lord Davey; Lord Robertson; Lord Lindley; Sir Ford North	Appeal dismissed	Quebec Court of King's Bench (Appeal Side)
Archambault et vir v. Archambault et al.	[1902] UKPC 39	"This is an Appeal from a Judgment of the Court of King's Bench for the Province of Quebec (Appeal Side), of the 29th May 1901, confirming the Judgment of the Superior Court, by which the action was tried in the first instance." The action was brought for the purpose of setting aside the testamentary disposition of a gentleman named Dr. Dieudonné Archambault, and certain gifts made by him in his lifetime, on the ground of his insanity, and on the ground that his testamentary disposition and gifts were induced by the undue influence, cajolery, and threats of the first Respondent, Miss Georgiana Archambault (hereinafter called the Respondent), who was the Defendant in the action.	**Lord Davey**; Lord Robertson; Sir Arthur Wilson	Appeal dismissed	Quebec Court of King's Bench
The Dominion Cotton Mills Company Limited and other v. The General Engineering Company of Ontario Limited	[1902] UKPC 42	"The question raised by this Appeal is simply what is the true construction of the last clause of Section 8 of the Canadian Patent Act cap. 61 of the revised Statutes of Canada as amended by Section 1 of the Canadian Act 55 & 56 Vict. c. 24."	Earl of Halsbury, Lord Chancellor; Lord Macnaghten; Lord Davey; Lord Robertson; **Lord Lindley**	Appeal allowed	Supreme Court of Canada
The Attorney General for the Province of Ontario v. The Attorney General for the Province of Quebec	[1902] UKPC 45	"This Judgment appealed against was pronounced by the Supreme Court of Canada in the exercise of a statutory jurisdiction, and it declares that the Arbitrators whose award was before the Court had jurisdiction to hear and adjudicate upon certain claims made by the Province of Quebec. The question before their Lordships is whether that decision is right."	Earl of Halsbury, Lord Chancellor; Lord Macnaghten; Lord Davey; **Lord Robertson**; Lord Lindley	Appeal allowed	Supreme Court of Canada
The Ontario Mining Company Limited and The Attorney General for the Dominion of Canada v. The Attorney General for the Province of Ontario	[1902] UKPC 46	"In this case leave was given by His Majesty in Council on the advice of this Board to appeal against a judgment of the Supreme Court of Canada dated the 5th June 1901. In their petition for leave to appeal the Appellants the Ontario Mining Company alleged that the title to 365,225 acres of land purporting to have been set aside by the Dominion Government as reserves for the Indians was affected by the judgment and represented that the question involved was one of great constitutional and general importance affecting not only the Dominion and Provincial Governments but also all the Indians in the Province of Ontario."	Earl of Halsbury, Lord Chancellor; Lord Macnaghten; **Lord Davey**; Lord Robertson; Lord Lindley	Appeal dismissed	Supreme Court of Canada
Joseph Kieffer v. Les Ecclésiastiques du Séminaire des Missions Etrangères à Québec	[1902] UKPC 47	"The questions debated in this case arise out of a litigation between adjoining land owners in the City of Montreal. Both parties were dissatisfied with the Judgment of the Court of King's Bench in Quebec sitting in appeal and have appealed to the King in Council."	Lord Macnaghten; **Lord Davey**; Lord Robertson; Lord Lindley	Appeal allowed	Quebec Court of King's Bench (Appeal Side)
The Imperial Bank of Canada v. The Bank of Hamilton	[1902] UKPC 48	"The question raised by this Appeal is whether the Bank of Hamilton is entitled to recover from the Imperial Bank of Canada a sum of 495 dollars paid to it in respect of a cheque under the following circumstances."	Lord Macnaghten; Lord Robertson; **Lord Lindley**; Sir Arthur Wilson	Appeal dismissed	Supreme Court of Canada
Lambe and another v. Manuel and other	[1902] UKPC 50	"This action in which the Attorney-General for the Province of Quebec has intervened was brought by the Collector of Provincial revenue for the District of Montreal against the Respondent John Manuel, sole acting executor and universal residuary legatee under the will of the late Allan Gilmour, a gentleman of considerable property who had his domicile in the Province of Ontario. The object of the action was to recover succession taxes claimed to be due under the Quebec Succession Duty Act of 1892 and the Acts amending the same in respect of certain parts of the testator's estate as being 'movable property...in the Province'."	Earl of Halsbury, Lord Chancellor; **Lord Macnaghten**; Lord Davey; Lord Robertson; Lord Lindley	Appeal dismissed	Quebec Court of King's Bench (Appeal Side)
The Bank of Toronto v. The St. Lawrence Fire Insurance Company	[1902] UKPC 51	"The John Eaton Company Limited were the owners of a large dry goods store in the City of Toronto. Their stock was insured in a number of offices and among others in the office of the St. Lawrence Fire Insurance Company of Montreal to the amount of $2,500. On the 20th of May 1897 the store with its contents was entirely destroyed by fire. The value of the goods burnt exceeded the aggregate amount of the insurance upon them."	Earl of Halsbury, Lord Chancellor; **Lord Macnaghten**; Lord Davey; Lord Robertson; Lord Lindley	Appeal allowed	Quebec Court of King's Bench (Appeal Side)
Cunningham v. Homma	[1902] UKPC 60	"In this case a naturalized Japanese claims to be placed upon the Register of Voters for the Electoral District of Vancouver City, and the objection which is made to his claim is that by the electoral law of the Province it is enacted that no Japanese, whether naturalized or not, shall have his name placed on the Register of Voters or shall be entitled to vote."	**Earl of Halsbury, Lord Chancellor**; Lord Macnaghten; Lord Davey; Lord Robertson; Lord Lindley	Appeal allowed	British Columbia Supreme Court
Kent and others v. La Communauté des Sœurs de Charité de la Providence and others	[1903] UKPC 17	"The action out of which this Appeal has arisen was commenced on the 29th November 1899 by the Appellants, Ambrose L. Kent and two others, in their character (qualité) of Liquidators of the Bank Ville-Marie, against the Respondents, La Communauté des Sœurs de Charité de la Providence, to recover the sum of $20,000 alleged to be owing by the Respondents to the Bank on a promissory note. The Bank Ville-Marie was and is a corporation having power to sue, and it formerly carried on business in Montreal and other places, but on the 10th August 1899 the Bank was ordered to be wound up under the provisions of the Canadian Winding-up Act of 1886 (Revised Statutes of Canada, c. 129), and the Appellants were duly appointed the Liquidators thereof."	Lord Macnaghten; **Lord Davey**; Lord Robertson; Lord Lindley; Sir Arthur Wilson	Appeal allowed	Quebec Court of King's Bench (Appeal Side)
The Kensington Land Company and others v. The Canadian Industry Company	[1903] UKPC 21	"This is an Appeal from a Judgment of the Court of King's Bench, affirming two Judgments of the Superior Court for the Province." "The litigants are two Companies—the Appellant Company is a Building Company and the Respondent Company is a Mining Company. The Appeal arises out of a sale of certain land made by the Respondent Company to the Appellant Company. The second Judgment is against the Liquidators of the Building Company, who intervened in the action."	**Earl of Halsbury, Lord Chancellor**; Lord Macnaghten; Lord Davey; Lord Robertson; Lord Lindley	Appeal dismissed	Quebec Court of King's Bench (Appeal Side)
Montreal v. The Montreal Street Railway Company	[1903] UKPC 44	"Under a contract dated the 8th of March 1893, expressed in English and made between The Montreal Street Railway Company and the City of Montreal, embodying a by-law (No. 210) passed by the City on the 21st of December 1892, the Company has established and is now operating lines of railway in Montreal for the conveyance of passengers by means of electric cars."	**Lord Macnaghten**; Lord Davey; Lord Robertson; Lord Lindley; Sir Arthur Wilson	Appeal dismissed	Quebec Court of King's Bench (Appeal Side)
Attorney General for the Province of Ontario v. Hamilton Street Railway Company and others	[1903] UKPC 51	"Their Lordships are of opinion that the Act in question, Revised Statutes of Ontario, 1897, cap. 246, intituled 'An Act to prevent the Profanation of the Lord’s Day,' treated as a whole, was beyond the competency of the Ontario Legislature to enact, and they are accordingly of opinion that the first question which was referred to the Court of Appeal for Ontario by the Lieutenant-Governor, pursuant to cap. 84 of the Revised Statutes of Ontario, 1897, ought to be answered in the negative."	**Earl of Halsbury, Lord Chancellor**; Lord Macnaghten; Lord Shand; Lord Davey; Lord Robertson; Lord Lindley	Appeal dismissed	Court of Appeal for Ontario
The Algoma Central Railway Company v. The King	[1903] UKPC 54	"In this case their Lordships think it is sufficient to express their concurrence in the Judgments of the learned Judges of the Supreme Court of Canada to which, in their opinion, it is not possible usefully to add anything. A foreign-built ship was bought by the Appellant Company in the United States, and brought to Canada. An application was made for registration. When that application was made, duty was claimed on the ship as coming under the head of 'goods' imported into Canada. It is difficult to see on what ground that claim could be resisted.	Earl of Halsbury, Lord Chancellor; **Lord Macnaghten**; Lord Shand; Lord Davey; Lord Robertson; Lord Lindley; Sir Arthur Wilson	Appeal dismissed	Supreme Court of Canada
Bertrand J. Clerque and another v. Elizabeth Murray and another	[1903] UKPC 55	"The Petitioners in this case brought an action in the High Court of Justice for Ontario for specific performance of an alleged contract. The High Court held that there was no contract in fact, and that, if there was a contract, there was no memorandum in writing to satisfy the Statute of Frauds. The Petitioners then appealed to the Court of Appeal for Ontario, which Court confirmed the decision of the High Court. The Petitioners were still dissatisfied. They had now two courses open to them. They might appeal either to His Majesty in Council, or to the Supreme Court of Canada. They elected to appeal to the Supreme Court of Canada, and the Supreme Court took the same view that had been taken in the Court of Appeal for Ontario and dismissed the Appeal. They now come to this Board, and ask this Board to advise His Majesty to give special leave to appeal from the Judgment of the Supreme Court of Canada."	**Lord Davey**; Lord James of Hereford; Lord Robertson; Sir Arthur Wilson	Appeal dismissed	Supreme Court of Canada
Harry Graves and Company Limited v. Gorrie	[1903] UKPC 56	"The Appellants and Respondents in these two Appeals which have been consolidated are alike shareholders in a joint stock company called the British American Bank Note Company. In this judgment the term 'Appellants' will mean the Appellants in the first and principal Appeal who are Defendants in the action and 'Respondents' will mean the Respondents in the same Appeal and Plaintiffs in the action. The Appellants and Plaintiffs in this case are the registered owners of the copyright of a picture called 'What we have we'll hold.' They acquired this copyright under Statute 25 & 26 Vict., c. 68, commonly called the Fine Arts Copyright Act, 1862. They have not complied with the Canadian Copyright Act, and have acquired no copyright in Canada apart from the copyright to which the statutes of the United Kingdom entitle them. The Defendant is a printer and publisher in Toronto, and he has printed, published, and sold in Canada copies of the Plaintiffs' picture without obtaining any license from them."	Lord Macnaghten; Lord Shand; Lord Robertson; **Lord Lindley**; Sir Arthur Wilson	Appeal dismissed	Court of Appeal for Ontario
Connolly and another v. The Consumers Cordage Company	[1903] UKPC 57	"The result of the course which this litigation has pursued is, that their Lordships are asked to give an opinion upon a question of fact which has never been litigated in the Court below, and upon a question of law which has never been argued there. With reference to the question of law their Lordships would, of course, be prepared to give their opinion, if the facts upon which that opinion was to be given were actually ascertained. But so much appears to depend upon the exact form of the alleged illegality, which may turn out to be only an offence against a particular law, that their Lordships regard it as more prudent not to enter into the question of law, and the distinctions arising from the law prevailing in the part of the Empire in question, until the facts have been actually ascertained."	**Earl of Halsbury, Lord Chancellor**; Lord Macnaghten; Lord Davey; Lord Robertson; Lord Lindley; Sir Arthur Wilson	Appeal allowed	Supreme Court of Canada
The Consolidated Car Heating Company v. Came	[1903] UKPC 59	"The Appellants are the assignees and proprietors of a Canadian patent (No. 26, 601), dated the 4th May 1887, and granted to one Sewall for improvements in hose coupling, and they sue the Respondent for infringement of their patent. The Respondent denies infringement and also raises other defences."	**Lord Davey**; Lord James of Hereford; Lord Robertson; Sir Arthur Wilson	Appeal dismissed	Quebec Court of King's Bench (Appeal Side)
The Trust Loan Company of Canada v. Gauthier and others	[1903] UKPC 60	"The question raised by this Appeal is whether a security given by a married woman on her separate property is valid or void under Article 1301 of the Civil Code of Lower Canada." "The Respondent Dame Hermine Labrice de Kerouack is the wife of M. Corriveau, but she is entitled to separate property. Such property consists of land in the town and district of Iberville. M. and Madame Corriveau, although duly separated as to property, lived together, and he managed her property. Considerable sums of money had been laid out upon it before 1897, and in particular some stables and a billiard room had been built. Part of the land had been laid out for building purposes."	Lord Davey; Lord James of Hereford; **Lord Lindley**; Sir Arthur Wilson	Appeal dismissed	Quebec Court of King's Bench (Appeal Side)
The Grand Hotel Company of Caledonia Springs Limited v. Wilson and others	[1903] UKPC 61	"The Appellants are the proprietors of certain lands in the township of Caledonia, Prescott County, Ontario. There are on this land three natural springs of mineral waters containing chemical properties which render them serviceable as table water and for medicinal purposes. The springs are in close proximity to each other, but differ widely in their character."	**Lord Davey**; Lord Robertson; Sir Arthur Wilson	Appeal dismissed	Court of Appeal for Ontario
Attorney General for the Province of British Columbia v. Ostrum	[1903] UKPC 71	"This appeal turns on the meaning of the expression 'income' in the Assessment Act, Chap. 179 of the Revised Statues of British Columbia, 1897. The Act contains no definition of the word. But it explains 'personal property' as comprehending, among other things, 'all income,' and it declares that 'all land and personal property and income in the Province shall be liable to taxation,' subject to certain exemptions, including the exemption of 'the income of every person up to one thousand dollars.'	**Lord Macnaghten**; Lord Lindley; Sir Andrew Scoble; Sir Arthur Wilson; Sir John Bonser	Appeal allowed	British Columbia Supreme Court (Full Court)
Chappelle and others v. The King	[1903] UKPC 73	'This case presents in the form of a Consolidated Appeal three several Appeals brought by special leave of His Majesty from the Supreme Court of Canada, which reversed the Judgment of Burbidge J. in the Exchequer Court by a majority of three Judges to two. In each of the three Appeals His Majesty the King is the sole respondent. In one – Chappelle's case – in which the Crown was not wholly successful before the Supreme Court, there is a Cross-Appeal on behalf of his Majesty."	**Lord Macnaghten**; Lord Davey; Lord Robertson; Lord Lindley; Sir Arthur Wilson	Appeal dismissed	Supreme Court of Canada
The Kingston Light Heat and Power Company v. The Corporation of the City of Kingston	[1904] UKPC 17	"Their Lordships entertain no doubt at all that the questions raised by this Appeal have been rightly decided by the learned Judges in Ontario." "It appears to their Lordships, as it did to the Courts below, that the terms of the Agreement of 14th July 1896 are conclusive against the Appellants' claim to receive compensation for the franchise and goodwill. The general word 'property', on which the Appellants' argument turns, is limited, as are the other substantives with which it is coupled, viz., 'works', 'plant', and 'appliances', by the words which follow, 'used for light, heat, and power purposes.' It is impossible to suppose that the ideas of franchise and goodwill are meant to be included in this description, which is one of physical objects.	Lord Macnaghten; **Lord Robertson**; Lord Lindley; Sir Arthur Wilson	Appeal dismissed	Court of Appeal for Ontario
Alexander McDonald v. Frank J. Belcher and others	[1904] UKPC 18	"Notwithstanding the time occupied by this case in argument, the questions for decision are very narrow indeed. The action, which was commenced in the Territorial Court of the Yukon Territory, was brought under circumstance similar to those which would arise in this country if a Plaintiff were to bring a number of actions comprehended in one Writ."	**Earl of Halsbury, Lord Chancellor**; Lord Lindley; Lord Kinross; Sir Arthur Wilson	Appeal allowed	Supreme Court of Canada
Blain v. The Canadian Pacific Railway Company	[1904] UKPC 33	"The question which is put forward by the Petitioners as the important question of law, for the decision of which they ask this Board to advise the Crown to exercise its prerogative of giving leave to appeal from the Supreme Court of Canada, is thus stated in the Petition: 'The Petitioners submit that their obligations to their passengers, whether arising out of contract, or otherwise, do not include the duty of protecting them against assaults by their fellow-passengers, or render them answerable in damages for failure to afford such protection.' Their Lordships are not disposed to advise His Majesty to give leave to appeal from the Supreme Court for the purpose of discussing that question."	**Lord Davey**; Lord Robertson; Sir Arthur Wilson	Appeal dismissed	Supreme Court of Canada
The Dominion Bank v. William Ewing and another	[1904] UKPC 53	"This is a Petition for special leave to appeal from the Supreme Court of Canada. The case was tried, in the first instance, by Mr. Justice Meredith (without a jury), when the learned Judge held that the note in question was forged and that the Petitioners were estopped from denying the signature by their not having informed the Bank in due time. There was an Appeal from that decision to the Court of Appeal for Ontario, and the Court dismissed the Petitioners' Appeal. The Petitioners then appealed to the Supreme Court of Canada, and that Court, consisting of five Judges, by a majority of three to two, dismissed the Petitioners' further Appeal. Their Lordships would not be disposed, in these circumstances, to advise His Majesty to exercise his prerogative in favour of the Petitioners, unless they were satisfied that there were strong grounds for believing that a very important question of the law was involved, and the Petitioners had made out a primâ facie case which would warrant their Lordships in advising His majesty to give special leave to appeal. Their Lordships are of opinion that the Petitioners have failed to make out any such case."	**Lord Davey**; Lord Robertson; Sir Arthur Wilson	Appeal dismissed	Supreme Court of Canada
The Midland Navigation Company Limited v. The Dominion Elevator Company Limited	[1904] UKPC 54	"Their Lordships think that this is not the case in which they can advise His Majesty to exercise His Prerogative. It is not for their Lordships to say whether they would or would not, have drawn the same inferences of fact as were drawn in the Supreme Court. The Petitioners seek to appeal from the adverse decision of the Supreme Court—invoked, it may be added, by themselves, because they were the Appellants to the Supreme Court. They come here, therefore, to ask for special leave to appeal, and the conditions under which such a leave can alone be granted are now very well known to gentlemen practising at the Bar, or ought to be. They would have to make out that there was a question of law of such great and general importance as would justify their Lordships in advising the exercise of the Prerogative. So far their Lordships can make out, no question of law at all arises here. The learned Counsel for the Petitioners was asked to state the question of law, and he did not succeed in satisfying their Lordships that there was any question of law in the case."	**Lord Davey**; Lord Robertson; Sir Arthur Wilson	Appeal dismissed	Supreme Court of Canada
The Toronto Railway Company v. The Corporation of the City of Toronto	[1904] UKPC 61	"The principal question on this Appeal is whether the cars used by the Appellants on their system of electric tramways in the City of Toronto and adjoining municipalities are liable to be taxed as real estate. There is another question whether the matter is res judicata between the parties."	**Lord Davey**; Lord Robertson; Sir Arthur Wilson; Sir Henri Elzéar Taschereau, CJC	Appeal allowed	Court of Appeal for Ontario
Hanson and another v. The Corporation of the Village of Grand Mère	[1904] UKPC 62	"The Appellants are holders of a debenture for $3,125 issued by the Stadacona Water, Light, and Power Company and purporting to be guaranteed by the respondents, the Corporation of the Village of Grand Mère, under the provisions of a Municipal Bye-law No. 10, passed on the 15th June 1889. The Appellants sue the Respondents on their guarantee. The Respondents plead (amongst other defences) that the Bye-law in question as well as a contract of the 20th June 1899 to give the guarantee were ultra vires and did not bind the Respondents on the ground that the Bye-law had not been approved by the majority in number and value of the municipal electors or authorised by the Lieutenant-Governor of the Province. It is admitted that the Bye-law was not even submitted to the electors for their approval or to the Lieutenant-Governor. The only question on this Appeal is whether the approval of the electors and the Lieutenant-Governor or of either of them was necessary the validity of the Bye-law."	Lord Macnaghten; **Lord Davey**; Lord Robertson; Lord Lindley; Sir Arthur Wilson	Appeal dismissed	Supreme Court of Canada
The Attorney General for the Province of Manitoba v. The Attorney General for the Dominion of Canada	[1904] UKPC 63	"The question raised by this Appeal is whether certain swamp lands were vested in the Province of Manitoba on the passing of a Canadian Statute in 1885, or whether they only came to be vested in that Province on certain later dates when the swamp lands were in fact transferred."	Lord Macnaghten; Lord Davey; **Lord Robertson**; Lord Lindley; Sir Arthur Wilson	Appeal dismissed	Supreme Court of Canada
The Calgary and Edmonton Railway Company and another v. The King	[1904] UKPC 64	"The Calgary and Edmonton Railway Company was incorporated in April 1890 by a Dominion Act for the purpose of making and working a railway from Calgary to Edmonton with an extension southerly to the boundary between Canada and the United States and northerly to the Peace River. Shortly after its incorporation the Company applied to the Minister of the Interior for a grant of Dominion lands in aid of the construction of the line, and by an Order in Council dated the 5th May 1890, the Governor-General sanctioned a recommendation by the Minister that, subject to the approval of Parliament, a grant of Dominion lands should be made to the Company at the usual rate of 6,400 acres per mile of the line from Calgary to Edmonton and from Calgary southerly to the international boundary, but subject to certain conditions which it is unnecessary to refer to."	Lord Macnaghten; Lord Davey; Lord Robertson; **Lord Lindley**; Sir Arthur Wilson	Appeal allowed	Supreme Court of Canada
The Attorney General for the Province of Prince Edward Island v. The Attorney General for the Dominion of Canada; The Attorney General for the Province of New Brunswick v. The Attorney General for the Dominion of Canada	[1904] UKPC 66; [1904] UKPC 67	"These Appeals have been brought against two decisions of the Supreme Court of Canada upon two questions referred to that Court for its opinion by Order in Council under the Canadian Act 54 & 55 Vict. c. 25. The two questions have arisen out of the same occurrences, though different considerations apply to them, and the two Appeals were argued together. They may conveniently be disposed of in one Judgment." "The British North America Act 1867, sect. 3, empowered her late Majesty in Council to declare by Proclamation that, on and after a day therein appointed, not being more than six months after the passing of the Act, the Provinces of Canada, Nova Scotia, and New Brunswick should form and be one Dominion under the name of Canada; and on and after that day those three Provinces were to form and be one Dominion under that name accordingly."	Lord Macnaghten; Lord Davey; Lord Robertson; Lord Lindley; **Sir Arthur Wilson**	Appeal dismissed	Supreme Court of Canada
McArthur v. The Dominion Cartridge Company Limited	[1904] UKPC 69	"This is an Appeal in formâ pauperis from a judgment of the Supreme Court of Canada, setting aside the verdict of a Special Jury in favour of the Appellant. The verdict was unanimous. And it had been upheld by the unanimous judgment of the Court of Review for the District of Montreal, and also by the unanimous judgment of the Quebec Court of King's Bench. In the Supreme Court Taschereau, J., dissented from his four colleagues. The facts of the case may be stated very briefly. On the 10th of June 1898 the Appellant, who was in the service of the respondent Company and then about 18 years of age, was seriously injured by an explosion at the Company's work. There is no direct evidence to show how the explosion occurred. It seems to have originated in an automatic machine used for filling shells or cartridges with powder and shot. The Appellant and another boy of about the same age who was his superior, were minding the machine at the time. It was the Appellant's duty to keep the shells with which the machine was fed supplied with shot and wads. The explosion was instantaneous. The flash communicated through a supply pipe with a powder box fixed on the outside of the wall of the room in which the machine stood. The box was placed there so that in the event of an accident the explosion might spend itself in the open air. However, for some reason or other, the box had been strengthened externally, and the force of the explosion took effect inwards. The wall was blown in, the machine knocked to pieces, and the room entirely wrecked."	**Lord Macnaghten**; Lord Davey; Lord Robertson; Lord Lindley; Sir Arthur Wilson	Appeal allowed	Supreme Court of Canada
The Corporation of the City of Toronto v. The Bell Telephone Company of Canada	[1904] UKPC 71	"This is an Appeal from a Judgment of the Court of Appeal for Ontario on a special case stated by agreement in two separate actions, in each of which the Appellants, the corporation of the City of Toronto, claimed an injunction against the Bell Telephone Company of Canada. The claim was founded upon the contention that the Telephone Company was not entitled to enter upon the streets and highways of the city and to construct conduits or lay cables thereunder, or to erect poles with wires affixed thereto upon or along such streets of highways without the consent of the Corporation."	**Lord Macnaghten**; Lord Davey; Lord Robertson; Lord Lindley; Sir Arthur Wilson	Appeal dismissed	Court of Appeal for Ontario
The Canadian Pacific Railway Company v. The Corporation of the City of Toronto	[1904] UKPC 73	"This is an Appeal from a unanimous Judgment of the Court of Appeal of Ontario confirming, except in one particular, a previous Judgment of Chancellor Boyd. The principal question between the parties is, whether a lease from the Corporation of the City of Toronto to the Canadian Pacific Railway Company ought to contain a covenant by the latter for the payment of taxes. There are two other questions, viz., at what date the payment of rent should commence, and whether interest is payable on arrears of rent, and, if so, from what date."	Earl of Halsbury, Lord Chancellor; Lord Macnaghten; **Lord Davey**; Lord Robertson; Lord Lindley; Sir Arthur Wilson	Appeal allowed in part	Court of Appeal for Ontario
The United States of America v. Gaynor and another	[1905] UKPC 4	"This is an Appeal from judgments of Mr. Justice Caron, one of the Judges of the Superior Court for Lower Canada, dated the 13th August 1902, dismissing motions made on behalf of the United States of America, on the 9th July 1902, to quash writs of habeas corpus granted by the said learned Judge to the respondents on the 21st June 1902, and ordering their liberation. The facts, which are not really in dispute, appear to be that the two respondents, Gaynor and Greene, had been in the employment of the Government of the United States of America, and have been charged with certain criminal offences in respect of certain transactions in the State of Georgia. While they were in Quebec application was made to an officer called an Extradition Commissioner for their arrest in pursuance of the international extradition arrangement between Canada and the United States of America."	**Earl of Halsbury, Lord Chancellor**; Lord Macnaghten; Lord Robertson; Lord Lindley; Sir Ford North; Sir Arthur Wilson	Appeal allowed	Quebec Superior Court
Burland v. Earle and others	[1905] UKPC 43	"In this case the sole question is, whether the Appellant should be charged with any or what interest on a sum which has been found due from the Appellant in respect of sums drawn by him for salary as President and Manager of the British American Bank Note Company, in excess of the sum of $12,000 per annum, to which he was admittedly entitled. The liability to repay this amount was declared by the Judgment of the Court of Appeal for Ontario dated the 13th November 1900, which was, as regards this matter, affirmed by the King in Council on the report of this Board. But neither the Judgment of the Court of Appeal for Ontario nor the Order in Council contained any direction for payment of interest on the sums overdrawn, nor was interest thereon asked for by the amended Statement of Claim in the action."	**Lord Davey**; Lord James of Hereford; Sir Andrew Scoble; Sir Arthur Wilson	Appeal allowed	Court of Appeal for Ontario
E.W. Gillett Company Limited v. Lumsden	[1905] UKPC 45	"The only question to be decided on this Appeal is whether a railway which is subject to the legislation of the Dominion can be sold in a suit by the trustees for bondholders to enforce a mortgage on the railway Company's railway, lands, and franchises. All the learned Judges who have taken part in the decision in the Courts below have decided that it can, and the Appeal is by the Railway Company against their decision."	**Lord Macnaghten**; Lord Davey; Sir Arthur Wilson	Appeal dismissed	Court of Appeal for Ontario
Alexander F.C. Ross v. Beaudry	[1905] UKPC 47	"The Appellant is Curator of the insolvent estate of John A. Bulmer & Co., lumber merchants in Montreal, and the Respondents were lessors of property occupied by that firm for the purposes of its business. On 19th May 1899 Bulmer & Co. made a judicial abandonment of their property for the benefit of their creditors under Article 853 of the Code of Civil Procedure, and at that date they were owing the Respondents rent for several years."	Lord Davey; Lord James of Hereford; **Lord Robertson**; Sir Andrew Scoble	Appeal allowed	Quebec Court of King's Bench (Appeal Side)
The Central Ontario Railway v. The Trusts and Guarantee Company Limited	[1905] UKPC 50	"The only question to be decided on this Appeal is whether a railway which is subject to the legislation of the Dominion can be sold in a suit by the trustees for bondholders to enforce a mortgage on the railway Company's railway, lands, and franchises. All the learned Judges who have taken part in the decision in the Courts below have decided that it can, and the Appeal is by the Railway Company against their decision."	Lord Macnaghten; **Lord Davey**; Sir Arthur Wilson	Appeal dismissed	Court of Appeal for Ontario
The Toronto Railway Company v. The Corporation of the City of Toronto	[1905] UKPC 53	"This is an Appeal from the Court of Appeal for Ontario. The result of the Appeal to that Court was that the Appellants, the Toronto Railway Company, were found liable to the Corporation of the City of Toronto for the payment of a mileage rate in respect of 940 feet of street railway track in Queen Street or Lake Shore Road west of Roncesvalles Avenue. They were, besides, ordered to pay interest in the money recovered in the action, but at a lower rate than that fixed by the Court from which the Appeal was brought. These two points are the only matters involved in the present Appeal. All other questions between the parties have been settled in the course of the action."	**Lord Macnaghten**; Lord Davey; Sir Arthur Wilson	Appeal dismissed	Court of Appeal for Ontario
Saunby v. The Water Commissioners of the City of London and The Corporation of the City of London	[1905] UKPC 54	"The Appellant is the owner and occupier of lands adjoining the river Thames in the Province of Ontario, and of a water mill operated by water from that river. He complains in this action that the Respondents by the erection of a dam with flash boards across the river Thames at a point some miles below the Appellant's mill have penned back the water in the river, with the result that in certain seasons of the year his lands are flooded, and the water power of his mill is interfered with. There is no serious dispute that the Appellant has in fact been injured by the Respondents’ works, and if this were all his right of action would be clear. But the Respondents the Water Commissioners, who are incorporated by a Provincial Act, 36 Vict. c. 102 (Ontario), for supplying the City of London with the pure water, contend at their Lordships' Bar that they are authorised by their Act to execute the works complained of, and the Appellant's remedy (if any) is to proceed by arbitration for damages under the provisions of the Act."	Lord Macnaghten; **Lord Davey**; Lord James of Hereford; Sir Arthur Wilson	Appeal allowed	Supreme Court of Canada
The Montreal Street Railway Company v. The City of Montreal	[1905] UKPC 55	"The main question in this Appeal is whether the City of Montreal is entitled under its contract with the Montreal Street Railway Company, to claim percentages upon the gross earnings arising from the whole operation of its railway whether within or without the limits of the City of Montreal, or whether such percentages are payable only in respect of such earnings as arise from the operation of its railway within the limits of the City."	Lord Davey; Lord James of Hereford; Lord Robertson; **Sir Andrew Scoble**	Appeal allowed	Supreme Court of Canada
The Ship Kitty D v. The King	[1905] UKPC 76	"In this case, to quote the language of Mr. Justice Davies, the question for determination is "solely one of fact." A vessel called the Kitty D, seized by the Canadian Government cruiser Petrel on the 3rd of July 1903 for fishing in Canadian waters, appeals against the Judgement of the Supreme Court of Canada which reversed the Judgment of Mr. Justice Hodgins who had tried the case and had found in favour of the Kitty D that she was in United States waters when she was fishing."	**Earl of Halsbury, Lord Chancellor**; Lord Macnaghten; Lord Davey; Lord James of Hereford; Lord Robertson; Sir Arthur Wilson	Appeal allowed	Supreme Court of Canada
The Montreal and St. Lawrence Light and Power Company v. Robert	[1906] UKPC 2	"By deed dated the 18th of July 1901, and made between the Respondent, Edmund Arthur Robert, and the Appellant, the Montreal and St. Lawrence Light and Power Company, Robert conveyed to the Company a lot of land known as Buisson Point, situated at the Cascade Rapids on the River St. Lawrence, in the County of Beauharnois and Province of Quebec, with the right of fishing in the river opposite and attached thereto."	**Lord Macnaghten**; Lord Davey; Sir Ford North; Sir Arthur Wilson	Appeal dismissed	Quebec Court of King's Bench (Appeal Side)
Dame Mary Miller ès-nom et ès-qualité v. The Grand Trunk Railway Company of Canada	[1906] UKPC 5	"The Appellant Mary Miller was the widow of Richard Ramsden, an employé in the service of the respondent Company. On the 10th January 1900 Ramsden was killed in a collision which took place between two trains on the Respondent Company's railway. The Appellant has brought this action on her own account and as tutrix of Ramsden's minor children against the Respondent Company for damages occasioned to them by the accident."	Lord Macnaghten; **Lord Davey**; Sir Ford North; Sir Arthur Wilson	Appeal allowed	Supreme Court of Canada
Robert v. Fairweather	[1906] UKPC 6	"The Bill of Complaint in this action was filed in the year 1896, to restrain the Defendant George E. Lloyd from obstructing the Plaintiff's alleged right of way over a road called Mount Stewart Street in the Parish of Rothesay in the Province of New Brunswick."	Lord Macnaghten; Lord Davey; **Sir Ford North**; Sir Arthur Wilson	Appeal allowed	Supreme Court of New Brunswick in Equity
The Attorney General for the Province of British Columbia v. The Canadian Pacific Railway Company	[1906] UKPC 11	"This is an Appeal from a Judgment, dated the 15th April 1905, of the Full Court of the Supreme Court of British Columbia, which affirmed a previous Judgment of a single Judge of the same Court..." "The Statement of Claim alleged that the public was entitled to certain rights of way over the foreshore of the sea in the City of Vancouver, and that the Defendants had so constructed their railway and works upon the foreshore as to obstruct those public rights of way..."	Lord Macnaghten; Lord Davey; Sir Ford North; **Sir Arthur Wilson**	Appeal dismissed	Supreme Court of British Columbia (Full Court)
The City of Montreal v. Cantin and others	[1906] UKPC 13	"In the year 1895 the City of Montreal was desirous of widening a section of Notre Dame Street, and on the 20th February 1895, in accordance with the procedure prescribed by the City Charter, the Commissioners appointed for the purpose deposited in the office of the City Treasurer a special roll of assessment."	Lord Macnaghten; **Lord Davey**; Lord Robertson; Lord Atkinson; Sir Arthur Wilson	Appeal dismissed	Supreme Court of Canada
E.R. Whitney, deceased, now represented by Neuberger and another, the Executors of his Will v. Joyce and another	[1906] UKPC 44	"This is an absolutely clear case, and it may be disposed of in a very few words. The Appellants have not discharged, or even attempted to discharge, the burden which falls upon a litigant in such a case as this."	**Lord Macnaghten**; Lord Dunedin; Lord Atkinson; Sir Arthur Wilson; Sir Henri Elzéar Taschereau	Appeal dismissed	Quebec Court of King's Bench (Appeal Side)
The Michigan Central Railroad Company and another v. The Lake Erie and Detroit River Company Railway Company	[1906] UKPC 45	"Their Lordships have considered the Judgments in this case. They accept entirely the Judgment of MacLennan J.A., and for the reasons therein contained they will humbly advise His Majesty to allow the Appeal, to discharge the Judgment of the Court of Appeal with costs, and to restore the Judgment of the learned Chancellor. The Respondents will pay the costs of this Appeal."	**Lord Macnaghten**; Lord Dunedin; Lord Atkinson; Sir Arthur Wilson; Sir Henri Elzéar Taschereau; Sir Alfred Wills	Appeal allowed	Court of Appeal for Ontario
Harsha v. United States of America	[1906] UKPC 48	"Their Lordships are of opinion that no argument has been addressed to them calculated to shake their confidence in the Judgments which are the subject-matter of this Appeal. Their Lordships do not think it necessary to enter further into the questions raised than to say that the Judgments appear to them to be right. They will therefore humbly advise his Majesty to dismiss the Appeal."	**The Earl of Halsbury**; Lord Macnaghten; Lord Dunedin; Lord Atkinson; Sir Arthur Wilson; Sir Alfred Wills	Appeal dismissed	Ontario High Court of Justice
The Attorney General for the Dominion of Canada v. Everett E. Cain and James Raymond Gilhula	[1906] UKPC 55	"The question for decision in this case is whether Section 6 of the Dominion Statute 60 & 61 Vict., c. 11 (styled in the Respondents’ case 'The Alien Labour Act') as amended by 1 Edw. VII., c. 13, Section 13, is, or is not, ultra vires of the Dominion Legislature. In the events which have happened the question has in this instance become more or less an academic one, inasmuch as the two person arrested under the Attorney-General's warrant granted under the authority of Section 6 were on 17th of June 1905 discharged from the custody by order of Mr. Justice Anglin, and a year having therefore elapsed since the date of their entry into Canada they cannot be re-arrested."	Lord Macnaghten; Lord Dunedin; **Lord Atkinson**; Sir Arthur Wilson; Sir Henri Elzéar Taschereau	Appeal allowed	Ontario High Court of Justice
Lapointe v. L'Association de Bienfaisance et Retraite de le Police de Montréal	[1906] UKPC 56	"The Appellant Lapointe, who was Plaintiff in the action, was a member of the Montreal Police Force for 29 years. He resigned on the 1st of March 1902. He resignation was accepted on the 8th of the same month. He was also a member of the Respondent Association, the Montreal Police Benevolent and Pension Society—a Society incorporated by Statute and governed by rules, published in both English and French, to which all members of the Society are bound to conform."	**Lord Macnaghten**; Lord Dunedin; Lord Atkinson; Sir Arthur Wilson; Sir Henri Elzéar Taschereau	Appeal allowed	Quebec Court of King's Bench (Appeal Side)
Emmerson v. Maddison	[1906] UKPC 57	"Appellant and those whom he represented in title had enjoyed uninterrupted occupation of a piece of land in the Province of New Brunswick, of about nine acres, from 1839 to 1895, a period of about 56 years. No rent had been paid and the occupation was open and unchallenged down to some time in 1895. This piece of land, described as a mill site in various conveyances under which it had passed, was and is land belonging to the Crown. The period of occupation was some three or four years short of the time necessary under the Nullum Tempus Act to give a right against the Crown by length of occupation."	Lord Macnaghten; Lord Dunedin; Lord Atkinson; Sir Arthur Wilson; **Sir Alfred Wills**	Appeal dismissed	Supreme Court of Canada
The Attorney General for the Province of British Columbia v. The Attorney General for the Dominion of Canada	[1906] UKPC 61	"The question here to be decided is as to the property of a small island called Deadman's Island, lying near the entrance to Burrand Inlet in the Harbour of Vancouver. It is admitted that no private individual has a right of property thereto, and the competition is as to whether the property of the Crown is here held for behoof of the Province of British Columbia within whose territorial bounds it is situate, or for behoof of the Dominion of Canada."	Lord Macnaghten; **Lord Dunedin**; Lord Atkinson; Sir Arthur Wilson; Sir Henri Elzéar Tascherea	Appeal dismissed	British Columbia Supreme Court
Joan Olive Dunsmuir v. James Dunsmuir and Edna Wallace Hopper	[1906] UKPC 62	"The action which gave rise to these Appeals was brought for the purpose of having the probate of the will of one Alexander Dunsmuir recalled, and the will set aside, on the ground of incapacity and undue influence."	**Lord Macnaghten**; Lord Atkinson; Sir Arthur Wilson; Sir Alfred Wills	Appeal dismissed	Supreme Court of British Columbia (Full Court)
Préfontaine v. Grenier	[1906] UKPC 66	"The controversy between the parties to this Appeal arises out of the collapse of the Banque du Peuple, a bank that carried on business in Montreal and elsewhere in the Province of Quebec, which collapse occurred on the 16 July 1895, when the Bank closed its doors."	Lord Macnaghten; Lord Dunedin; Lord Atkinson; **Sir Arthur Wilson**; Sir Henri Elzéar Taschereau; Sir Alfred Wills	Appeal dismissed	Quebec Court of King's Bench (Appeal Side)
The Home Insurance of New York v. Victoria-Montreal Fire Insurance Company	[1906] UKPC 67	"This Appeal raises a question under a so-called re-insurance policy. The only point now open for consideration is whether, according to the true construction of the contract between the parties, the claim is or is not barred by time."	**Lord Macnaghten**; Lord Dunedin; Lord Atkinson; Sir Arthur Wilson; Sir Alfred Wills	Appeal allowed	Supreme Court of Canada
The Brothers of the Christian Schools and other v. The Minister of Education for the Province of Ontario and another	[1906] UKPC 68	"This is an Appeal from the Ontario Court of Appeal upon a Reference of the Lieutenant-Governor in Council under the provisions of Chapter 84 of the Revised Statutes of Ontario, 1897. The question submitted to the Court in substance was this: Are members of the two Religious and Educational Communities known as 'the Brothers of the Christian Schools' and 'the Community General Hospital, Almshouse, and Seminary of Learning of the Sisters of Charity of Ottawa,' commonly called 'The Grey Nuns', who became members of those communities after the passing of the British North America Act, 1867, to be considered qualified teachers for the purposes of the Separate Schools Act, and therefore eligible for employment as teachers in the Roman Catholic Separate Schools within the Province of Ontario when such members have not received certificates of qualification to teach in the public schools of the Province?	**Lord Macnaghten**; Lord Dunedin; Lord Atkinson; Sir Arthur Wilson; Sir Alfred Wills	Appeal dismissed	Court of Appeal for Ontario
The Grand Trunk Railway Company of Canada v. The Attorney General for the Dominion of Canada	[1906] UKPC 72	"The question in this Appeal is as to the competency of the Dominion Parliament to enact the provisions contained in Section 1 of 4 Edw. VII., cap. 31, of the Statutes of Canada. These provisions may be generally described as a prohibition against any 'contracting out' on the part of railway companies within the jurisdiction of the Dominion Parliament from the liability to pay damages for personal injury to their servants. It is not disputed that in the partition of duties effected by the British North America Act, 1867, between the Provincial and the Dominion legislatures, the making of laws for through railways is entrusted to the Dominion.	Lord Macnaghten; **Lord Dunedin**; Lord Atkinson; Sir Arthur Wilson; Sir Alfred Wills	Appeal dismissed	Supreme Court of Canada
The Richelieu and Ontario Navigation Company, Owners of the Steamship "Canada" v. The Owners of the Steamship "Cape Breton"	[1906] UKPC 76	In this case the Appellants, the owners of the steamship 'Canada,' appeal from a Judgement of the Supreme Court of Canada dated the 3rd October 1905, allowing an Appeal from a Judgment or Decree of the Judge in Admiralty of the Exchequer Court of Canada, Quebec Admiralty District, pronounced on the 19th November 1904, and ordering and adjudging that the said Judgment should be reversed and set aside, and that the steamship 'Canada' was alone to blame for the collision between the Respondents' steamship 'Cape Breton' and the said steamship 'Canada' in the River St. Lawrence a short distance below the town of Sorel, on the 12th June 1904, at about 2.35 a.m., and that the steamship 'Cape Breton' and her owners were entitled to recover from the Appellants, and condemning the Appellants to pay to the steamship 'Cape Breton' and her owners the damages arising out of the said collision and that the action should be remitted to the said Exchequer Court of Canada for the assessment of such damages, and that the Appellants should pay the costs below and in the Supreme Court.	Lord Macnaghten; Lord Davey; Lord Robertson; Lord Atkinson; **Sir John Gorell Barnes**	Appeal dismissed	Supreme Court of Canada
The Ship "Albano" and her freight v. The Allan Line Steamship Company, Limited; Union Dampfschiffsrhederei Actiengesellschaft v. "The Steamship Parisian" and her freight	[1907] UKPC 11	"These Appeals arise out of an action brought by the Allan Line Steamship Company, Limited (Respondents), the owners of the steamship "Parisian," against the steamship 'Albano' and her freight (Appellants), and a cross-action brought by the Union Dampfschiffsrhederei Actiengesellschaft, a body corporate (Appellants), the owners of the steamship 'Albano,' against the steamship 'Parisian' and her freight (Respondents). The action and the cross-action were brought in respect of a collision which took place between the 'Parisian' and the 'Albano' off the entrance to Halifax Harbour, Nova Scotia, about five o'clock in the afternoon of the 25th March 1905, in which both vessels were seriously damaged.	Present at the Hearing: Lord Macnaghten; Lord Davey; Sir Arthur Wilson; **Sir John Gorell Barnes** Nautical Assessors: Admiral Rodney M. Lloyd, C.B. Captain W.F. Caborne, C.B., R.N.R.	Appeal allowed	Supreme Court of Canada
The Actieselskad Langfond (Owners of the Steamship "Langfond") v. The Canadian Forwarding and Export Company Limited	[1907] UKPC 14	"The action out of which this Appeal arises was brought by the Respondents, as charterers, against the Appellants, as owners, of the steamship 'Langfond', to recover damages for breach of the charter party."	Earl Loreburn, Lord Chancellor; Lord Macnaghten; Lord Davey; **Sir Arthur Wilson**	Appeal dismissed	Superior Court of Quebec (in review)
The Corporation of the City of Toronto v. The Toronto Railway Company	[1907] UKPC 17	"The question in these Appeals turn upon the construction of the Agreement, confirmed by Statute, regulating the rights of the Appellants and Respondents respectively in regard to the working of a certain street railway in the City of Toronto."	Lord Macnaghten; Lord Atkinson; **Lord Collins**; Sir Arthur Wilson	Appeal allowed in part	Supreme Court of Canada; Court of Appeal for Ontario
Barrette v. Le Syndicat Lyonnais du Klondyke	[1907] UKPC 22	"This Appeal arises out of a transaction which took place in 1901, by which the Appellant sold to the respondents certain gold mining claims, and shares in claims, with other properties in Yukon."	Lord Macnaghten; Lord Robertson; Lord Atkinson; **Sir Arthur Wilson**	Appeal allowed	Supreme Court of Canada
McGregor v. The Esquimalt and Nanaimo Railway Company	[1907] UKPC 44	"This is an Appeal from the British Columbia Supreme Court. The Respondents, a Company incorporated by an Act of the Legislature of the Province of British Columbia, claimed by their action the title to a certain lot of land in that Province, including all mines and minerals therein and thereunder, under a grant to them in 1887 by the Dominion Government. The Appellant, in answer to the action, claimed the title to this same lot in fee simple in virtue of a grant to him, in 1904, by the British Columbia Government, issued under the provisions of an Act of the Legislature of the Province entitled 'The Vancouver Island Settlers’ Rights Act, 1904'."	Lord Robertson; Lord Collins; Sir Arthur Wilson; **Sir Henri Elzéar Tascherea**; Sir Alfred Wills	Appeal allowed	Supreme Court of British Columbia (Full Court)
Dumphy v. The Montreal Light Heat and Power Company	[1907] UKPC 49	"Although there is a very voluminous record in this case, the facts are of singular simplicity. A building contractor used a derrick in putting up a house in one of the streets of Montreal. His workmen brought the derrick into contact with the overhead wires of the Respondents, with the result that a current of electricity was diverted to the street and killed the husband of the Appellant."	**Lord Robertson**; Lord Collins; Sir Arthur Wilson; Sir Henri Elzéar Taschereau; Sir Alfred Wills	Appeal dismissed	Quebec Court of King's Bench (Appeal Side)
McCormick v. Simpson and others	[1907] UKPC 50	"The question on this Appeal is as to the construction of the will of one James Cooper, who died at Montreal in 1866 possessed of real and personal property. The will was made at Montreal, and is dated August 20th 1863."	Lord Robertson; **Lord Collins**; Sir Arthur Wilson; Sir Henri Elzéar Taschereau, CJC; Sir Alfred Wills	Appeal dismissed	Quebec Court of King's Bench (Appeal Side)
The Esquimalt Waterworks Company v. The Corporation of the City of Victoria	[1907] UKPC 52	"This action was brought to restrain the respondents from entering upon certain lands of the Appellants and from posting thereon notices under the Act of British Columbia, intituled 'The Water Clause Consolidation Act, 1897,' and the substantial question is whether the Respondents can appropriate for the purposes of the municipality certain waters flowing from two different sources, Goldstream River and Niagara Creek, which water the Appellants claim to be theirs under the Esquimalt Waterworks Act, 1885, and the Esquimalt Waterworks Extension Act, 1892."	Lord Robertson; Lord Collins; Sir Arthur Wilson; **Sir Alfred Wills**	Appeal allowed	Supreme Court of British Columbia(Full Court)
Cabot v. The Attorney General of the Province of Quebec	[1907] UKPC 53	"In 1898 the Appellant purchased the Seigniory and Fief of Grand River, in the county of Gaspé, as described in the original deeds of concession, made of the said Seigniory by the King of France, and containing about two leagues in front of the whole depth and bounded, in front by the Gulf of St. Lawrence, in rear by the township Rameau, on one side towards the west by the Seigniory of Pabos, with all the fishing and hunting and other rights and privileges which the vendor had or might have as Seignior, or along its frontage on the sea shore. Other words follow, and other exceptions from the grant; but the real question is whether a grant of the King of France, to which the Appellant admittedly has right, gives him the exclusive right to fish salmon ex adverso of the lands which are the primary subject of the grant."	**Lord Robertson**; Lord Collins; Sir Arthur Wilson; Sir Henri Elzéar Taschereau; Sir Alfred Wills	Appeal dismissed	Quebec Court of King's Bench (Appeal Side)
Townsend v. Cox	[1907] UKPC 54	"These cases come before this Board under the following circumstances:– The Appellant is an hotel-keeper at Kentville, Nova Scotia, where the Canada Temperance Act, 1888, 51 Vict., cap. 34, was at all material times in force. On the 23rd September 1905, in consequence of an information laid before two Justices by the Respondent under that Act, a search warrant was issued to search the said hotel and premises for intoxicating liquor suspected to be kept for sale thereon. On the 25th September the search warrant was duly executed and large quantities of intoxicating liquor were found there, and brought before the Justices to be dealt with according to law."	Lord Robertson; **Lord Collins**; Sir Arthur Wilson; Sir Henri Elzéar Taschereau; Sir Alfred Wills	Appeal dismissed	Nova Scotia Supreme Court
The Corporation of the City of Toronto v. The Canadian Pacific Railway Company	[1907] UKPC 58	"The question on this Appeal is as to the liability of the Appellants, the Corporation of the City of Toronto, to pay a share of the cost of certain protective measures ordered by the Railway Committee of the Privy Council of Canada for the purpose of safeguarding the public streets at points within or immediately adjoining the city boundary. At two of the crossings the southern boundary of the railway is the northern boundary of the city. In third the crossing is wholly within the city."	Lord Robertson; **Lord Collins**; Sir Arthur Wilson; Sir Alfred Wills	Appeal dismissed	Court of Appeal for Ontario
McVity and another v. Tranouth and another	[1907] UKPC 65	"The only question in this case is which of two innocent parties is to bear the loss occasioned by the fraud of one Sootheran, a dishonest lawyer. One of the parties trusted him as professional adviser; the other dealt at arm's length with him as an honest man."	Earl Loreburn, Lord Chancellor; Lord Macnaghten; Lord Atkinson; Lord Collins; **Sir Arthur Wilson**	Appeal allowed	Supreme Court of Canada
Zacklynski and others v. Polushie and others	[1907] UKPC 66	"In this case, by a majority of three judges to two, the Supreme Court of Canada reversed the judgment of the Supreme Court of the North-West Territories. That Court, sitting in banco (Sifton C.J. dissenting), had affirmed a decision pronounced by the trial judge in favour of the Plaintiffs. The Plaintiffs are now the Appellants."	Earl Loreburn, Lord Chancellor; **Lord Macnaghten**; Lord Atkinson; Lord Collins; Sir Arthur Wilson	Appeal dismissed	Supreme Court of Canada
McConnell v. Beatty and another	[1907] UKPC 68	"The controversy out of which this Appeal arises relates to two parcels of mining land in the district of Algoma, Ontario. In the year 1887 the lands in question were undoubtedly vested in fee simple in William H. Beatty. But in that year, the taxes payable upon the lands having fallen into arrear, the lands were put up for sale by the proper Government Officer, in order to realise the arrears. A number of properties were sold at about the same time, under similar circumstances, the sales being held on 11th November and 14th December 1887. The lands now in question were sold on the 14th December, and one Thomas H. Bull became the purchaser of these lands and of a large number of other lots."	Lord Robertson; Lord Collins; **Sir Arthur Wilson**; Sir Henri Elzéar Taschereau; Sir Alfred Wills	Appeal allowed	Court of Appeal for Ontario
The Quebec Improvement Company v. The Quebec Bridge and Railway Company	[1908] UKPC 4	"These are Appeals from the Court of King's Bench, Lower Canada. The Appellants, the Quebec Improvement Company, were the owners of three lots or pieces of land, in the immediate neighbourhood of Quebec, which the Quebec Bridge and Railway Company required for the purposes of their undertaking. The parties were unable to agree as to the price, and the matter was referred to arbitration. The result was an award which the Railway Company impeached by an action at law, and the Improvement Company in a separate action sought to enforce."	**Lord Macnaghten**; Lord Robertson; Lord Atkinson; Lord Collins; Sir Arthur Wilson	Appeal dismissed	Quebec Court of King's Bench (Appeal Side)
The McArthur Export Company v. J.B. Klock	[1908] UKPC 7	"When disentangled from a mass of details having no effect on its decision, this case stands out in singular simplicity. It is an action for goods, to wit timber, sold and delivered; and the allegations of the Plaintiffs (now the Respondents) are contained in ten lines of print. The sale alleged is by a written contract, produced; and the delivery is said, in the writ, to be detailed in an account produced, this document again being of excellent brevity and precision, covering only five lines of print, but stating all that was necessary, the pieces delivered, their sizes and the price charged. The decree sought is for payment of the price of the wood."	Lord Macnaghten; **Lord Robertson**; Lord Atkinson; Lord Collins; Sir Arthur Wilson	Appeal allowed	Quebec Court of King's Bench (Appeal Side)
The Toronto Railway Company v. King and another	[1908] UKPC 11	"The action out of which this appeal rises was brought by the Respondents, the representatives of one David King, deceased, who lost his life in a collision between a delivery van which he was driving, and an electric tramcar belonging to the Defendants (the Appellant Company), brought about (as it is alleged) by the negligent management of the tramcar by the servant of the Company employed to drive it."	Earl Loreburn, Lord Chancellor; Lord Macnaghten; Lord Atkinson; Lord Collins; **Sir Arthur Wilson**	Appeal dismissed	Court of Appeal for Ontario
Fulton v. Norton	[1908] UKPC 33	"Their Lordships think that a cause of action arose in this case upon the definite refusal of the Defendant (the Appellant), in the letters of the 2nd May 1906 and the 4th May 1906, to submit the Respondent's Petition of Right to the Lieutenant-Governor. The Statute says that this is to be done, and says nothing as to the advice with which the Petition is to be accompanied, if any advice is tendered."	**Earl Loreburn, Lord Chancellor**; Lord Robertson; Lord Atkinson; Sir Arthur Wilson; Sir Henri Elzéar Taschereau	Appeal dismissed	Supreme Court of Canada
The King v. McLean	[1908] UKPC 34	"The question in this Appeal arises on a demurrer. If, on any reasonable construction of the Respondent's Petition of Right, a cause of action could be proved, the respondent (the Suppliant) would be entitled to succeed. It will be for the learned Judge who hears the case, when the facts have been proved, to decide whether a cause of action has or has not arisen, but it is not for their Lordships to express an opinion beforehand, on the pleadings as they stand."	**Earl Loreburn, Lord Chancellor**; Lord Robertson; Lord Atkinson; Sir Arthur Wilson	Appeal dismissed	Supreme Court of Canada
The Commercial Rubber Company Limited v. The Corporation of the Town of St. Jerome	[1908] UKPC 35	"The facts which gave rise to the litigation involved in this case are as follows. In September 1896, the Respondent Municipal Corporation, by a bye-law in the regular form, voted in favour of a certain manufacturing company, called the Boston Rubber Company, a bonus of $50,00, in consideration of which, by its subsequent acceptance thereof, the Company bound itself to acquire, within the limits of the municipality of St. Jerome, a water power or other motor power as well as immovable properties, upon which was to be constructed a building for the operation of the business of the Company during at least 10 consecutive years without intermittance; to employ during the first year not less than 150 employees all residing within the limits of the municipality, 50 of whom were to be heads of families, and to pay at least $50,000 in salaries; ..."	Lord Robertson; Lord Atkinson; Sir Arthur Wilson; **Sir Henri Elzéar Taschereau**	Appeal dismissed	Quebec Court of King's Bench (Appeal Side)
R. v. Walkem	[1908] UKPC 47	"This application touches several very delicate and difficult questions on which their Lordships desire to express no opinion. In any case they would be very slow to interfere, at the instance of a prosecution, with a new trial directed by the Court of Appeal in favour of the accused; and on that ground they find it impossible to advise His Majesty to grant special leave to appeal in this case. The Petitioner must pay the Respondent's costs of the Petition."	**Lord Macnaghten**; Lord Atkinson; Lord Collins; Sir Arthur Wilson	Appeal dismissed	Supreme Court of British Columbia
The Corporation of the City of Toronto v. John Russell	[1908] UKPC 49	"This is an Appeal from a judgment of the Court of Appeal for Ontario, dated the 23rd December 1907, upholding the judgment of the trial judge, whereby it was held that a sale of certain lands of the Plaintiffs (Respondent) to the Defendants (Appellants) in respect of taxes due to the Defendants thereout was invalid, and that a certain deed, dated the 1st October 1902, by which the said lands were conveyed to the Defendants, should be delivered up to be cancelled, and further that the Plaintiff was entitled to redeem the said lands on paying to the Defendants all the taxes due thereout, including those which had accrued since the said sale, together with the interest thereon."	Lord Robertson; **Lord Atkinson**; Lord Collins; Sir Arthur Wilson; Sir Henri Elzéar Taschereau	Appeal allowed	Court of Appeal for Ontario
William Jose and others v. The Metallic Roofing Company of Canada, Limited	[1908] UKPC 50	"This litigation arises out of a strike of workmen in the employment of the Plaintiffs (Respondents), and other proceedings following thereupon. The strike is the only matter which their Lordships think it necessary to deal with on this Appeal. The Plaintiffs were manufacturers employing workmen in their business. The Defendants (as the suit was ultimately constituted) were eight persons, sued on their own behalf, and on behalf of the members of a local Toronto trade union, and also on behalf of the members of another union of wider scope."	Lord Robertson; Lord Atkinson; Lord Collins; **Sir Arthur Wilson**	Appeal dismissed	Court of Appeal for Ontario
Mary Watts v. Rubin Watts	[1908] UKPC 53	"The only question raised in the present Appeal is whether the Supreme Court of British Columbia has jurisdiction to entertain a petition for divorce, the marriage having been solemnized in that Colony, between persons domiciled therein, and the matrimonial offences charged being alleged to have been committed therein."	Lord Macnaghten; Lord Atkinson; **Lord Collins**; Sir Arthur Wilson	Appeal allowed	Supreme Court of British Columbia (Full Court)
Prévost and others v. Prévost and others	[1908] UKPC 56	"This is an Appeal from a judgment of the Supreme Court of Canada, dated the 15th November 1906, reversing the judgment of the Superior Court sitting in Review at Montreal. The action was instituted by Armand Prévost and Adèle Prévost, two of the children of Amable Prévost, deceased, to obtain partition of the portion of their father's estate which their brother, Louis Roméo Prévost, deceased, took under their father's will of the 24th December 1844."	Earl Loreburn, Lord Chancellor; Lord Robertson; **Lord Atkinson**; Sir Arthur Wilson; Sir Henri Elzéar Taschereau	Appeal allowed	Supreme Court of Canada
Alfred S. Woodruff and others v. The Attorney General for the Province of Ontario	[1908] UKPC 57	"The question on these Appeals is as to the right of the Attorney-General of the Province of Ontario to demand payment of a tax called in the Provincial Act which imposed it 'succession duty,' upon personal property locally situate outside the Province and alleged by him to form part of the estate of a deceased domiciled inhabitant of the Province, one Samuel De Veaux Woodruff."	Lord Robertson; Lord Atkinson; **Lord Collins**; Sir Arthur Wilson	Appeal allowed	Court of Appeal for Ontario
The Crown Grain Company, Limited and the Attorney-General for the Province of Manitoba v. H.L. Day and the Attorney-General for the Dominion of Canada	[1908] UKPC 58	"By the 101st section of the British North America Act, 1867, the Parliament of Canada was authorized to provide for 'the constitution, maintenance, and organisation of a general Court of Appeal for Canada'; and by Act of the Dominion Parliament the Supreme Court of Canada was accordingly established, the existing statute being Rev. Stat. Canada, 1906, c. 139. It is inconceivable that a Court of Appeal could be established without its jurisdiction being at the same time defined..."	Earl Loreburn, Lord Chancellor; **Lord Robertson**; Lord Atkinson; Sir Arthur Wilson; Sir Henri Elzéar Taschereau	Appeal dismissed	Supreme Court of Canada
La Compagnie Hydraulique de St. François v. The Continental Heat and Light Company and another	[1908] UKPC 59	"A Statute, 60 & 61 Vict. c. 72, of the Parliament of Canada incorporated the Respondent Company and enacted that (s. 7) it might manufacture, supply, sell, and dispose of gas and electricity, with other powers. Subsequent provincial Statutes of Quebec incorporated the Appellant Company, and granted it the exclusive privilege of producing and selling electricity within a radius of thirty miles from the village of Disraeli, in the Province of Quebec."	Lord Robertson; Lord Atkinson; **Sir Arthur Wilson**; Sir Henri Elzéar Taschereau	Appeal dismissed	Quebec Court of King's Bench (Appeal Side)
La Rose Mining Company, Limited, v. The Temiskaming and Northern Ontario Railway Commission and others	[1909] UKPC 1_1	"This is an Appeal from a judgment of the Court of Appeal for Ontario dismissing an appeal from Mabee, J., the Trial Judge, who dismissed the Appellants' action with costs. The Appellants (Plaintiffs) claim a declaration that they are entitled to the mining rights under that portion of the right of way of the Temiskaming and Northern Ontario Railway which runs across or through a certain mining location, J.S. 14, the property of the Plaintiffs, and claim an injunction restraining the Defendants from dealing or in any way interfering with the ores, mines, and mining rights under the said portion of the right of way."	Lord Robertson; Lord Atkinson; **Lord Collins**; Sir Arthur Wilson	Appeal dismissed	Court of Appeal for Ontario
The Dominion Coal Company, Limited, v. The Dominion Iron and Steel Company, Limited and The National Trust Company, Limited; and The Dominion Iron and Steel Company, Limited and The National Trust Company, Limited, v. The Dominion Coal Company, Limited	[1909] UKPC 3	"In this case the Dominion Coal Company (hereinafter called the Coal Company), the Defendant in the Action, appeals from a Judgment of the Supreme Court of Nova Scotia, dated the 22nd January 1908, affirming the Judgment of Mr. Justice Longley in favour of the Respondents (the Plaintiffs in the Action), by which specific performance of a certain agreement, dated the 20th October 1903, entered into between the Coal Company and the Dominion Iron and Steel Company, Limited (hereinafter called the Steel Company), was decreed, and the Plaintiffs were declared entitled to damages for certain breaches of this agreement, which damages were referred for assessment."	Lord Robertson; **Lord Atkinson**; Lord Collins	Appeal allowed in part	Nova Scotia Supreme Court
The Grand Trunk Railway Company of Canada v. W.N. Robertson	[1909] UKPC 4	"The question on this Appeal really is, whether or not Section 3 of the Act of the late Province of Canada of 1853 (16 Victoria cap. 37) is impliedly repealed by the Dominion Railway Act of 1906 (6 Edw. VII. Cap. 42), which is to prevail when the Provincial Act is inconsistent with it."	**Earl Loreburn, Lord Chancellor**; Lord Macnaghten; Lord Atkinson; Lord Collins; Lord Gorell	Appeal dismissed	Supreme Court of Canada
The United Shoe Machinery Company of Canada v. Brunet and others	[1909] UKPC 10	"In this case the Plaintiffs appeal from the final Judgment, dated the 26th June, 1907, of the Quebec Court of King's Bench (Appeal Side), affirming a judgment dated the 30th March, 1906, of the Superior Court of that Province, whereby certain contracts, entered into between the Appellants and the Respondents, were declared to be null and void, and the action of the Appellants for an injunction to restrain the Respondents from continuing to violate some of the most material provisions of these contracts, and to recover damages for past breaches of the same, was dismissed."	Lord Macnaghten; **Lord Atkinson**; Lord Collins; Lord Gorell	Appeal allowed	Quebec Court of King's Bench (Appeal Side)
Louis Blue and Joseph Stephen Deschamps trading together under the name of Blue and Deschamps v. The Red Mountain Railway Company	[1909] UKPC 13	"The Plaintiffs (Appellants) are saw-mill owners and timber merchants who own certain property in the neighbourhood of Rossland in the Province of British Columbia. The Defendants, the Red Mountain Railway Company, own and work a line of railway running northwards to Rossland from the boundary line of British Columbia and the United States of America."	Lord Atkinson; Lord Collins; **Lord Shaw**; Sir Arthur Wilson	Appeal allowed	Supreme Court of Canada
William Price v. The Chicoutimi Pulp Company and the Attorney General of the Province of Quebec	[1909] UKPC 25	"This is an Appeal from a Judgment of the Court of King's Bench of Quebec (Appeal Side), dated the 6th February, 1907, which reversed a Judgment of Gagné J., sitting in the Superior Court for Quebec, District of Chicoutimi, and dismissed the Plaintiff's Action. The Action was brought by the Appellant against the Respondent Company to establish his right of ownership in certain lands, and the wharves built thereon, on the bank of what is known as the Basin of Chicoutimi, through which the Chicoutimi River runs into the Saguenay River."	Lord Atkinson; Lord Collins; **Sir Arthur Wilson**	Appeal dismissed	Quebec Court of King's Bench (Appeal Side)
Bow, McLachlin and Company Limited v. The Ship "Camosun" and the Union Steamship Company of British Columbia, Limited, the Owners of the said Ship	[1909] UKPC 35	"This Appeal raises a question of considerable interest and importance as to the jurisdiction in Admiralty of the Exchequer Court of Canada."	Earl Loreburn, Lord Chancellor; Lord Ashbource; Lord James of Hereford; **Lord Gorell**; Lord Shaw	Appeal allowed	Supreme Court of Canada
The Canadian Pacific Railway Company v. Robert Henderson Bryce, deceased (now represented by his Executor, William Henry Johnson), and others	[1909] UKPC 38	"The Appellants in this case are the Canadian Pacific Railway Company, the owners of the steamship 'Princess Victoria' which came into collision about or near the Parthia Shoal off Brockton Point near Vancouver at about 2.20 p.m. on the 21st July 1906, with the steamer 'Chehalis,' and in consequence the latter vessel sank, and some of her passengers and crew were drowned.	Present at the Hearing: Lord Macnaghten; Lord Collins; **Lord Gorell**; Sir Arthur Wilson Nautical Assessors: Admiral Sir Archibald L. Douglas, G.C.V.O., K.C.B. Commander W.F. Caborne, C.B., R.N.R.	Appeal allowed	British Columbia Supreme Court
Henry L. Sprague v. John R. Booth	[1909] UKPC 43	"In January, 1902, the respondent Booth, who was the owner of substantially all the stock of the Canada Atlantic Railway Company, entered into a contract with Arthur L. Meyer for the sale of the same. By the terms of the contract Booth became bound, on receipt of the purchase price of ten million dollars, on the 1st June, 1902, to transfer to Meyer the whole of the stock standing in his name."	Lord Macnaghten; **Lord Dunedin**; Lord Collins; Sir Arthur Wilson	Appeal dismissed	Court of Appeal for Ontario
The James Bay Railway Company v. Samuel W. Armstrong	[1909] UKPC 45	"This is an Appeal by special leave from an Order of the Supreme Court of Canada, dismissing as incompetent an Appeal and a Cross Appeal from a judgment of the High Court of Ontario in the matter of an Arbitration under the Canada Railway Act, 1903."	**Lord Macnaghten**; Lord Dunedin; Lord Collins; Sir Arthur Wilson	Appeal dismissed	Supreme Court of Canada
The Dominion Natural Gas Company, Limited v. James H. Collins; and The Dominion Natural Gas Company, Limited v. Florence Mary Perkins and others	[1909] UKPC 46	"The Defendants, the Dominion Natural Gas Company, recover natural gas from certain gas-bearing strata situated at a considerable depth below the surface of the ground and distribute this gas as a commercial product. In order to obtain a way-leave for their main, they entered into a contract with the Defendants, the Toronto, Hamilton & Buffalo Railway Company, of which one of the terms was that they should supply the Railway Company with gas at reduced rates at certain buildings belonging to the Railway Company, and should furnish meters and regulators for the gas so supplied."	Lord Macnaghten; **Lord Dunedin**; Lord Collins; Sir Arthur Wilson	Appeal dismissed	Court of Appeal for Ontario
The SS. Senlac Company Limited and others v. The SS. Rosalind and her freight	[1909] UKPC 47	"Their Lordships do not desire to call upon the Respondent in this case. They think that the Appellants have not shown any ground for disturbing the unanimous judgment of the Supreme Court of Canada. They agree with the Supreme Court in thinking that the 'Senlac' was navigated with a reckless disregard of her own safety and the safety of any other vessel which might be approaching her. Their Lordships have had an opportunity of conferring with the Nautical Assessors, and that is their view also. Their Lordships will therefore humbly advise His Majesty that this Appeal should be dismissed. The Appellants must pay the costs.	Present at the Hearing: **Lord Macnaghten**; Lord Atkinson; Lord Collins; Lord Gorell Nautical Assessors: Admiral Sir Archibald L. Douglas, G.C.V.O., K.C.B. Commander W.F. Caborne, C.B., R.N.R.	Appeal dismissed	Supreme Court of Canada
The St. John Pilot Commissioners and The Attorney General for the Dominion of Canada v. The Cumberland Railway and Coal Company	[1909] UKPC 50	"The question for determination on this Appeal is, whether certain vessels belonging to the respondents were, when entering and leaving the port of Saint John, New Brunswick, liable to pilotage dues under the provision of the Pilotage Act, Revised Statutes of Canada, 1886, Ch. 80, Secs. 58 and 59."	Earl Loreburn, Lord Chancellor; Lord Ashbourne; Lord Collins; **Lord Gorell**; Sir Arthur Wilson	Appeal allowed	British Columbia Supreme Court
The Richelieu and Ontario Navigation Company, Owners of the Steamer "Prescott" v. G.B. Taylor, Owner of the Steamer "Havana"	[1909] UKPC 51	"This is an Appeal from the Supreme Court of Canada. The action which has given rise to the Appeal was brought by the owner of the S.S. 'Havana,' a Lake freight steamboat, or 'coarse freighter', as such boats are called in the Upper Lakes, to recover damages for injuries sustained in a collision with a passenger steamer called the 'Prescott'."	Present at the Hearing: **Lord Macnaghten**; Lord Collins; Lord Gorell; Sir Arthur Wilson Nautical Assessors: Admiral Sir Archibald L. Douglas, G.C.V.O., K.C.B. Commander W.F. Caborne, C.B., R.N.R.	Appeal dismissed	Supreme Court of Canada

== Summary by year and result ==
Year	Number of Cases	Appeal Allowed		Appeal Dismissed	
1900	6	3	50.0%	3	50.0%
1901	5	3	60.0%	2	40.0%
1902	10	5	50.0%	5	50.0%
1903	13	3	23.1%	10	76.9%
1904	14	5	35.7%	9	64.3%
1905	9	6	66.7%	3	33.3%
1906	18	6	33.3%	12	66.7%
1907	15	8	53.3%	7	46.7%
1908	14	5	35.7%	9	64.3%
1909	14	6	42.9%	8	57.1%
Total Cases	118	50	42.4%	68	57.6%
Annual Averages	11.8	4.2		5.8	

== Summary by jurisdiction and court appealed from ==
Jurisdiction	Number of Appeals	On Appeal from Supreme Court of Canada		On Appeal from Other Courts	
Federal	15	15	100.0%	0	0.0%
Ontario	38	11	28.9%	27	71.1%
Quebec	43	8	18.6%	35	81.4%
Nova Scotia	2	0	0.0%	2	100.0%
New Brunswick	2	1	50.0%	1	50.0%
Manitoba	2	1	50.0%	1	50.0%
British Columbia	13	2	15.4%	11	84.6%
Prince Edward Island	0	0	0.0%	0	0.0%
North-West Territories	1	1	100.0%	0	0.0%
Yukon	2	2	100.0%	0	0.0%
Total	118	41	34.7%	77	65.3%

== See also ==
- List of Canadian appeals to the Judicial Committee of the Privy Council, 1867–1869
- List of Canadian appeals to the Judicial Committee of the Privy Council, 1870–1879
- List of Canadian appeals to the Judicial Committee of the Privy Council, 1880–1889
- List of Canadian appeals to the Judicial Committee of the Privy Council, 1890–1899
- List of Canadian appeals to the Judicial Committee of the Privy Council, 1910–1919
- List of Canadian appeals to the Judicial Committee of the Privy Council, 1920–1929
- List of Canadian appeals to the Judicial Committee of the Privy Council, 1930–1939
- List of Canadian appeals to the Judicial Committee of the Privy Council, 1940–1949
- List of Canadian appeals to the Judicial Committee of the Privy Council, 1950–1959

== Sources ==
- British and Irish Legal Information Institute: Privy Council Decisions
- 1900 Privy Council Decisions
- 1901 Privy Council Decisions
- 1902 Privy Council Decisions
- 1903 Privy Council Decisions
- 1904 Privy Council Decisions
- 1905 Privy Council Decisions
- 1906 Privy Council Decisions
- 1907 Privy Council Decisions
- 1908 Privy Council Decisions
- 1909 Privy Council Decisions
