= List of Newfoundland appeals to the Judicial Committee of the Privy Council (pre-1949) =

Newfoundland appeals to the JCPC (pre-1949)

List of Newfoundland cases of the Judicial Committee of the Privy Council cases (pre-1949)

This page lists cases appealed from the Newfoundland courts to the Judicial Committee of the Privy Council, prior to 1949.

Before 1949, Newfoundland was a separate British possession, with Dominion status from 1907 to 1949. An appeal lay from the Newfoundland courts to the Judicial Committee of the Privy Council, the highest court in the British Empire and Commonwealth. In 1949, Newfoundland joined Canada as a province. In the same year, Canada ended all appeals from Canadian courts to the Judicial Committee, but court cases begun prior to the abolition date could still be appealed to the Judicial Committee. Cases begun after the abolition date could be appealed to the Supreme Court of Canada.

Case name	Citation	Subject (Exact text from judgment)	Presiding justices (decision written by justice whose name is bold)	Was the lower-court ruling sustained?	Court of origin
The Direct United States Cable Company (Ltd) and others v. The Anglo-American Telegraph Company (Ltd) and others	[1877] UKPC 5	This is an Appeal from the Supreme Court of Newfoundland against an order confirming an injunction granted against the Appellants, to prevent their infringing the rights originally granted by an Act of the Legislature of Newfoundland, 17 Vict. cap. 2, to a Company incorporated by the name of "The New York, Newfoundland, and London Telegraph Company."	Lord Blackburn; Sir James W. Colvile; Sir Barnes Peacock; Sir Montague E. Smith; Sir Robert P. Collier	Sustained	Supreme Court of Newfoundland
The Government of Newfoundland v. The Newfoundland Railway Company and others	[1888] UKPC 7	In this case, the Defendant is the Government of Newfoundland. The Plaintiff Company was incorporated for the purpose of constructing and working a railway in pursuance of a contract with the Government, for which the Government undertook to pay a subsidy ad to make grants of land. The other Plaintiffs as trustees for bondholders of the Company are assignees of a portion of that railway, of whatever right the Company have to the subsidy, and of the grants of land in respect of such portion. The Plaintiffs contend that the Government is bound to pay a certain amount of subsidy and to make grants of land for a completed portion of the railway, though as a whole it is not completed. The Government denies the liability, but, if it exists, sets up certain counter claims against the Company.	Lord Fitzgerald; Lord Hobhouse; Sir Barnes Peacock; Sir Richard Couch	Overturned Partially	Supreme Court of Newfoundland
Walks v. Baird and another	[1892] UKPC 47	This is an appeal from an order of the Supreme Court of Newfoundland. The Respondents by their statement of claim alleged that the Appellant wrongfully entered their messuage and premises, and took possession of their lobster factory and of the gear and implements therein, and kept possession of the same for a long time, and prevented the Respondents from carrying on the business of catching and preserving lobsters at their factory.	Lord Watson; Lord Hobhouse; Lord Herschell; Lord Macnaghten; Lord Morris; Lord Hannen; Sir Richard Couch; Lord Shand	Sustained	Supreme Court of Newfoundland
The owners of the steamship Cyphrenes her cargo and freight v. The Steamship La Flandre	[1896] UKPC 15	Shortly after 6 a.m. of 30 December 1893, two steamships upon opposite courses when nearly a mile apart, sighted each other in the open Atlantic, somewhere about longitude 45· 30’ north, and latitude 49· west. One of them, the "Cyphrenes," of 1,309 tons register burthen and 250 horse-power, was bound with a cargo from Savannah to Liverpool, and was steering E. ¼ N. The other, the "La Flandre," an oil tank ship of 1,510 tons register and 200 horse-power, was on a voyage in water ballast from Antwerp to New York, her course being W.S.W. Both ships were making full speed, that of the ‘Cyphrenes" being 9, and that of the "La Flandre" 7 knots per hour [sic]. The morning was dark, with drizzling rain; but the atmosphere was free from fog, and it is not disputed by either vessel that, from the time when they became visible to each other until the moment of collision, she continued to see the light of the other ship.	Lord Watson; Lord Davey; Sir Richard Couch	Sustained	Supreme Court of Newfoundland
James P. Fox and others v. The Government of Newfoundland	[1898] UKPC 32	The Commercial Bank of Newfoundland suspended payment on 10 December 1894 and on 7 January 1895 an Act of the Newfoundland Legislature (58 Vict. Cap. 3) was passed for its winding-up and liquidation. The Appellants are the trustees appointed for that purpose. By Section 2 of the Act the provisions of Chapter 90 of the Consolidated Statutes of Newfoundland entitled "Of Insolvency" were made applicable to the winding=up of the Bank in the same manner as they applied to individuals and partnership. Of these Section 34 provided that next after preferential payments provided for in the preceding section all debts and claims due to the Crown or to the government of revenues of the Colony should form a prior claim upon the estate and effects of any person declared insolvent.	Lord Watson; Lord Hobhouse; Lord Davey; Sir Richard Couch	Overturned Partially	Supreme Court of Newfoundland
Gaden v. The Newfoundland Savings Bank	[1899] UKPC 2	This is an Appeal from the Newfoundland Supreme Court in an action instituted by the Appellant against the respondent. For the purpose of this Appeal the facts are stated in a joint case and in the admissions of the parties. On 8 December 1894, the Appellant having to her credit in the Commercial Bank at St. John’s the sum of 3,850.07, went about 11 o'clock on the morning of that day to the Bank and there drew a cheque payable to herself or bearer for the full amount of her balance and presented it to the ledger-keeper who by direction of the manager certified it in the usual manner by writing his initials across it and delivered it thus initialled to the Appellant. At the same time the cheque was charged to the Appellant’s account in the books of the Bank, and an entry was also made in her pass-book balancing the account. This cheque the Appellant immediately took to the office of the Respondents, the Savings Bank, and there without endorsing it, deposited it; and an entry was thereupon made by the respondents’ officer in the Appellant’s savings Bank pass-book in these words: - 1894, 8 December, deposit $3.850.07.	Lord Watson; Lord Hobhouse; Lord Davey; Sir Henry Strong	Sustained	Supreme Court of Newfoundland
Hugo Young Master of the Steamship Furnesia v. The Steamship Scotia	[1903] UKPC 53	This is an Appeal from a Judgment of the Supreme Court of Newfoundland in a salvage suit in which the S.S. "Scotia" was arrested for salvage services. The salvage services, which will be referred to hereafter, were of no ordinary character, but the only question of law before the Board is whether the vessel so arrested was, or was not liable to seizure, she being (as it is alleged) the property of the Crown.	The Lord Chancellor; Lord Macnaghten; Lord Shand; Lord Davey; Lord Robertson; Lord Lindley; Sir Arthur Wilson	Sustained	Supreme Court of Newfoundland
The Glenwood Lumber Company Limited v. George L. Phillips (Since deceased and now represented by Robert K. Bishop)	[1904] UKPC 23	In the year 1898 the Appellants and the respondent Phillips respectively applied to the Governor in Council of the Colony of Newfoundland for licences to cut timber on certain block of timber land near the Main River flowing into Grander Lake in that Colony. The respondent Phillips is hereafter referred to as the respondent. The practice appears to be for such applications to be first considered in the Colonial Secretary’s office, and if they are approved, a notification is sent to the Minister of Agriculture and Mines from whose office the license are then issued. On 16 November 1898 the Deputy-Colonial Secretary wrote a letter of that date to the Minister of Agriculture and Mines enclosing four licences to cut timber which (he stated had been approved by His Excellency the Governor and which had been granted to the following persons, viz., to the respondent two blocks, one of which is the area in question in this litigation, and to the Appellants two other blocks.	Lord Macnaghten; Lord Davey; Lord Lindley; Sir Arthur Wilson	Sustained	Supreme Court of Newfoundland
John McNeil (now deceased) and other v. Monroe	[1904] UKPC 22	The action which has given rise to this Appeal was brought by the respondent James Harvey Monroe, to recover certain fully paid shares in the Colonial Cordage Company, Limited, as having been specifically bequeathed to him by the will of his brother, Moses Monroe.	Lord Macnaghten; Lord Davey; Lord Lindley; Sir Arthur Wilson	Sustained	Supreme Court of Newfoundland
W.H. Martin Executor of the will of R. Hunt deceased, v. G.J. Adams	[1904] UKPC 21	Their Lordships will humbly advise His Majesty that the Judgment of the Supreme Court ought to be varied by adding $2,250, as from the date of the Order in Council approving this Report, to the sum of $12,132.05, for which Judgment was thereby directed, or intended to be directed, to be entered for the Plaintiffs: that interest on the $2,250 should commence from the date of the Order in Council: and that the Cross-Appeal should be dismissed. There will be no costs of either Appeal.	Lord Macnaghten; Lord Davey; Lord Lindley; Sir Arthur Wilson	Overturned Partially	Supreme Court of Newfoundland
Walter Baine Grieve v. Marion Jack Tasker	[1905] UKPC 68	Their Lordships are of opinion that the Appeal which has been presented to His Majesty in Council is incompetent, and that the first Petition (the Petition of the respondent) ought to be granted, and their Lordships will state shortly their reasons for coming to this conclusion. It is not necessary to go through the whole of this long and complicated story. The starting point is an action commenced by the Respondent against the Appellant on 23 December 1896 in the Newfoundland Supreme Court. IN this action Judgment was given on 13 October 1897, declaring the liability of the Appellant, and on 6 April 1898 the Supreme Court made a final decree for payment by the Appellant of $22,295. The objection which is taken against that decree is that, at the time when it was made, the Appellant (the Defendant) had obtained his discharge in certain bankruptcy proceedings in Scotland.	Lord Davey; Sir Ford North; Sir Andrew Scoble; Sir Arthur Wilson	Sustained	Supreme Court of Newfoundland
George Shea Mayor of St. John's Municipal Council v. The Reid-Newfoundland Company	[1908] UKPC 51	This Appeal comes from Newfoundland, and is concerned with certain statutory privileges and obligations of a street railway company in times of snow. By the St. John’s Street Railway Act, 1806, the respondent Company were authorized to construct, maintain, and operate a street railway in the town of St. John’s. The railway was constructed; and its rails lie, and are used in, a number of streets in the town.	Lord Robertson; Lord Atkinson; Lord Collins; Sir Arthur Wilson	Overturned	Supreme Court of Newfoundland
The Reid-Newfoundland Company v. The Anglo-American Telegraph Company Limited	[1908] UKPC 52	The Newfoundland Supreme Court has decided that the Appellants are bound to account to the respondents for certain messages transmitted by them through a wire carried along a section of the system of railways now in their occupation. This wire, which belongs to the respondents, was originally provided by them for the use of a company incorporated in 1881, under the name of "the Newfoundland Railway Company," who were predecessors in title of the Appellants.	Lord Macnaghten; Lord Collins; Sir Arthur Wilson	Sustained	Supreme Court of Newfoundland
The Reid-Newfoundland Company v. The King	[1908] UKPC 39	Their Lordships think that the judgment of the Court below is perfectly right, and that there is nothing whatever in the contract in question which exempts the Company from the taxation which has been imposed by the statute (5 Edw. VII., c. 6.). Their Lordships will humbly advise His Majesty that the Appeal be dismissed. The Appellants will pay the costs.	Lord Macnaghten; Lord Atkinson; Lord Collins; Sir Arthur Wilson	Sustained	Supreme Court of Newfoundland
The Reid Newfoundland Company v. The Anglo-American Telegraph Company	[1910] UKPC 31	This is an Appeal from a Judgment of the Full Bench of the Newfoundland Supreme Court, delivered on 1 May 1909. The precise form of the Judgment it seems unnecessary to examine. It is enough to say that in substance it restrained the Appellant Company (the Railway Company) from erecting, maintaining, or operating a live of telegraph upon their own land, for the purposes of the efficient working of their own railway, with the usual incidents which naturally follow from such an injunction.	Lord Macnaghten; Lord Collins; Lord Shaw; Sir Arthur Wilson	Overturned	Supreme Court of Newfoundland
The Reid-Newfoundland Company v. The Anglo-American Telegraph Company Limited	[1912] UKPC 29	This Appeal is from a Judgment of the Supreme Court of Newfoundland in an action brought on 2 November 1905 by the Anglo-American Telegraph Company against the Reid-Newfoundland Company, wherein the Defendants had pleaded the Statutes of Limitations (21 Jac. I, chapter 16, and local statutes) as to so much of the Plaintiffs’ claim as accrued prior to 2 November 1899. The Plaintiffs had replied that the pleas disclosed no defence because the action was taken on a specialty contract under which the period of limitation was 20 years. The issue thus raised was heard on 1 February 1911 before the Full Court, which decided, by a majority of two out of three Judges (Mr Justice Emerson dissenting), that the Plaintiffs’ replication was good.	Lord Macnaghten; Lord Shaw; Lord Mersey; Lord Robson	Sustained	Supreme Court of Newfoundland
The Commercial Cable Company v. The Attorney-General of Newfoundland	[1912] UKPC 51	In June 1905, when the Newfoundland Legislature passed the Taxing Act which imposes a tax a telegraphic cables, the only Telegraph Company doing business in the Colony was the Anglo-American. That Company, as the successors of the New York, Newfoundland, and London Telegraph Company, still possessed special rights and privileges in the island, including the right to compete for traffic with the Government. But the exclusive right of landing cables on the island which had been enjoyed by the Company and its predecessors for the period of fifty year had just expired.	Lord Macnaghten; Lord Atkinson; Lord Shaw	Overturned	Supreme Court of Newfoundland
The Anglo-Newfoundland Development Company v. The Newfoundland Pine and Pulp Company	[1913] UKPC 42	In this case the Respondents, the Newfoundland Pine and Pulp Co., Ltd. (which may be conveniently styled the Pulp Co.), are suing the Appellants, the Anglo-Newfoundland Development Co., Ltd. (which may be conveniently styled the Development Co.), for the value of timber belonging to the Pulp Co. Which it is alleged the Development Co. Cut and carried away and disposed of to its own use. The case was heard in the first instance before Mr. Justice Johnston, who found in favour of the Pulp Co. For the sum of $6,040 in respect of timber which had admittedly been wrongfully cut and appropriate by the Development Co., but he disallowed the claim in respect of certain other timber which he held that the Development Co. were entitled to cut and appropriate under a certain reservation clause of a sub-license which will be more particularly dealt with later on. On appeal to the full Court his Judgment upon the latter point was reversed and the damages were accordingly increased to $15,536.68. it is against this variation of the Judgment of Mr. Justice Johnston that the present Appeal is brought. The figures at which the damages have been assessed are not in dispute. The sole question is as to the right to recover these damages at all.	Lord Atkinson; Lord Shaw; Lord Moulton	Sustained	Supreme Court of Newfoundland
Bowring Brothers, Limited v. Henry Toke Munn	[1914] UKPC 8	Their Lordships have had an opportunity of considering this case. The only question in dispute is the construction of the letter of 10 June 1912 which, at all events, was intended to be in effect a charter party. It is a dubious document in itself, and it is rendered more so by the interpretation which the parties themselves have put upon it; because they altered it by consent at the time of payment. The point in dispute really is whether the vessel in question was chartered month by month, or chartered for a definite period of three months. The Court below came to the conclusion that it was a monthly hiring. That decision ought not to be overruled unless their Lordships are clearly of opinion that it was wrong. The Appellants have not been able to convince them that it was wrong, and, under those circumstances, their Lordships will humbly advise His Majesty that the Appeal should be dismissed with costs.	Lord Atkinson; Lord Moulton; Lord Shaw; Lord Sumner	Sustained	Supreme Court of Newfoundland
The Commercial Cable Company v. The Government of Newfoundland	[1916] UKPC 80	This is an appeal from the conclusion come to by a majority of the Newfoundland Supreme Court. What has to be determined is whether the appellants, who are an American company incorporated in the State of New York, are entitled to recover two sums of $12,000 and $10,916.13, alleged to be due under an agreement under the Great Seal of Newfoundland, dated 18 February 1909, to which the parties were the appellants and the Governor of Newfoundland in Council.	The Lord Chancellor; Viscount Haldane; Lord Atkinson; Lord Shaw; Lord Parmoor	Sustained	Supreme Court of Newfoundland
Imperial Tobacco Company Limited v. Michael A. Duffy	[1917] UKPC 99	The appellants are a company incorporated in Newfoundland and are dealers in tobacco. In 1910 they adopted and have ever since used upon tobacco which they placed upon the Newfoundland market a trade-mark consisting of a presentation of a clover leaf, describing the goods as the ‘Clover" brand. In May or June 1915 the appellants found that the respondent was importing into and selling in Newfoundland tobacco which he bought from Messrs. Larus and Brother Company, a company incorporated in Virginia, United States of America, which bore a similar trade-mark, and was described as "Clover Lead" tobacco. Thereupon, on 21 June 1915, the appellants registered their trade-mark in Newfoundland and commenced this action, claiming an injunction to restrain the defendant from infringing the plaintiffs’ trade-mark.	Lord Parker of Waddington; Lord Sumner; Lord Wrenbury	Overturned	Supreme Court of Newfoundland
The Commercial Cable Company v. the Attorney-General of Newfoundland	[1920] UKPC 42	This is an appeal from the Newfoundland Supreme Court. There is also an application for special leave to appeal against orders striking out two defences. The appellants wish to raise a point arising upon an alleged alteration of the text of a Bill after it left the two Chambers and before it received the Governor's assent.	Viscount Haldane; Lord Moulton; Lord Sumner; Lord Parmoor	Sustained	Supreme Court of Newfoundland
The Standard Oil Company of New York v. T. and M. Winter	[1920] UKPC 64	In this appeal their Lordships are in a position to state at once the advice which they will tender to the Sovereign. The respondents were plaintiffs in an action for breach of contract, and they were claiming against the appellants, from whom they recovered damages. The question is whether it was properly found that the contract was broken.	Viscount Haldane; Lord Buckmaster; Viscount Cave; Lord Dunedin; Lord Atkinson; Mr. Justice Duff	Sustained	Supreme Court of Newfoundland
A. E. Hickman Company Limited v. G. Jarvis Company	[1921] UKPC 7	Their Lordships are of opinion that this appeal cannot succeed. It arises out of an alleged breach of a contract to deliver certain casks of fish by the defendants to the plaintiffs, and the only question is what was the contract.	Lord Buckmaster; Lord Dunedin; Lord Shaw	Sustained	Supreme Court of Newfoundland
The Nova Scotia Steel and Coal Company Limited v. The Minister of Finance and Customs	[1922] UKPC 56	Their Lordships will humbly advise His Majesty that this appeal should be dismissed with costs. As applied to the appellant company, the Business Profits Tax Act, 1917, imposes on them a tax of 20 per cent of the net profits arising from the earned by their Newfoundland business for the accounting period in question. The earlier Act, 10 Edw. VII, ch. 26, provides that for a time, which includes that period, there shall be levied or imposed upon or in respect of the ore, which it is the appellants’ Newfoundland business to export from Bell Island, no other or further charge than the amount of 7 ½ cents per ton.	Lord Buckmaster; Lord Atkinson; Lord Sumner; Lord Parmoor	Sustained	Supreme Court of Newfoundland
Olive Christian and others v. Charles F. Taylor and another	[1926] UKPC 63	This is an appeal from a judgment of the Newfoundland Supreme Court on an application by the respondent Taylor as the administrator, with the will annexed, of the estate of one William Brazel for directions as to the construction of his will. the will was dated 17 February 1896, and the testator died on 21 April 1897. He left a considerable estate, consisting mainly of land, some of it with houses on it, in Newfoundland. Part of this land is said to have been freehold and the rest leasehold.	Viscount Haldane; Lord Shaw; Lord Wrenbury; Lord Darling; Lord Salvesen	Overturned	Supreme Court of Newfoundland
The Dominion of Canada of the One Part (Reasons) v The Colony of Newfoundland of the other Part (Canada)	[1927] UKPC 25	In 1922, Canada and Newfoundland agreed to ask the Privy Council to decide only "What is the location and definition of the boundary as between Canada and Newfoundland in the Labrador Peninsula under the Statutes, Orders in Council, and Proclamations?" The Privy Council was confined to this question; it could not create a new boundary or suggest a territorial compromise. The main point in the case was the meaning of "coast," for that was how Labrador was legally described.	The Lord Chancellor; Viscount Haldane; Lord Finlay; Lord Warrington of Clyffe; Lord Sumner	That Labrador with the islands adjacent thereto, is annexed to Newfoundland, and under the Government of that Island.	Government of Canada & Government of Newfoundland
Hugh Francis Hoole and others v. The Royal Trust Company and another	[1930] UKPC 74	This is an appeal from a judgment of the Supreme Court of Newfoundland (Chief Justice Horwood and Mr. Justice Higgins) dated the 1st March, 1929, affirming a judgment of Mr. Justice Kent dated the 5th December, 1927. These judgment were pronounced in an action of account brought by the plaintiffs (appellants) against the firm of C.F. Bennett & Co., now represented by the defendants (respondents) and the issue in the action with which the present appeal is concerned is as to the alleged liability of the plaintiffs to account to the defendants for the balance of the proceeds of 720 casks of Labrador codfish consigned by the defendants to Genoa in November, 1921, for sale.	The Lord Chancellor; Lord Blanesburgh; Lord Darling; Lord Tomlin	Sustained	Supreme Court of Newfoundland
Aveline Scott Ditcham v. James J. Miller	[1931] UKPC 50	This is an appeal from an order of the Full Bench of the Supreme Court of Newfoundland and its raises he broad question whether within the meaning of the St. John’s Municipal Acts, 1921 and 1926, the respondent in relation to certain hereditaments in that city demised by a lease of the 16th may, 1848, had on the expiration of the term on the 1st May, 1929, become the "assign" of the original lessees so as to be entitled in terms of these statutes to claim compensation for unexhausted improvements from the appellant, the reversioner and freedholder.	Lord Blanesburgh; Lord Atkin; Lord Macmillan	Overturned	Supreme Court of Newfoundland
George Jardine and another v. The Attorney-General of Newfoundland and another	[1932] UKPC 1a	The main question involved in this appeal may be shortly stated. It is whether a timber license granted to the appellant Jardine and assigned by him to the appellant Martin (who is a timber merchant) is a subsisting license or has been effectively determined by or on behalf of the Crown. The relevant facts, however, do not admit of brief statement, and must be set forth in some detail.	Viscount Dunedin; Lord Merrivale; Lord Thankerton; Lord Russell of Killowen; Sir Lancelot Sanderson	Overturned	Supreme Court of Newfoundland
The Reid Newfoundland Company, Limited, and others v. The Government of Newfoundland	[1933] UKPC 49	Their Lordships, having heard this case very fully and very ably argued by Counsel for the appellants, see no reason to differ from the conclusions which have been reached by both Courts in Newfoundland or with the reasons which are given by the learned Judges for their decisions. Their Lordships will humbly advise His Majesty that this appeal be dismissed with costs.	Lord Blanesburgh; Lord Thankerton; Lord Russell of Killowen	Sustained	Supreme Court of Newfoundland
Martin Cashin and others v. Peter J. Cashin	[1938] UKPC 1	This is an appeal from the judgment of the Supreme Court of Newfoundland (Sir William H. Horwood C.J., Kent J. and Higgins J.) given on the 8th January, 1937, dismissing by a majority (Kent J. dissenting) an appeal from the judgment of Sir William H. Horwood C.J. given on the 21st July, 1936. By the judgment it was ordered that an agreement under seal dated the 8th September, 1927, to which the appellants and the respondent were parties be set aside, and declared to be null and void.	Lord Atkin; Lord Thankerton; Lord Russell of Killowen; Lord Wright; Lord Maugham	Overturned	Supreme Court of Newfoundland
United Towns Electric Company Limited v. His Majesty’s Attorney General	[1939] UKPC 5	This is an appeal by leave of the Supreme Court of Newfoundland from a judgment of that Court dated the 1st May, 1937, which confirmed assessments to income tax made on the appellant for the years 1929 to 1934 inclusive in respect of all its undertakings.	Lord Atkin; Lord Thankerton; Lord Russell of Killowen; Lord Wright; Lord Porter	Overturned	Supreme Court of Newfoundland
