= Mohori Bibee v Dharmodas Ghose =

1902 Indian contract law case

- Court: Judicial Committee of the Privy Council
- Full case name: Mohori Bibee and another v Dharmodas Ghose
- Decided: 4 March 1902
- Citations: [1903] UKPC 12, (1903) LR 30 IA 114

Case history
- Appealed from: High Court of Judicature at Fort William

Court membership
- Judges sitting: Lord Macnaghten; Lord Davey; Lord Lindley; Sir Ford North; Sir Andrew Scoble; Sir Arthur Wilson

Case opinions
- Decision by: Sir Ford North

Keywords
- Contract law, minority, mortgage

Mohori Bibee v Dharmodas Ghose, [1903] UKPC 12, is a major Indian contract law case decided by the Judicial Committee of the Privy Council. The case held that a contract entered into by a minor is totally void.

== Facts ==
Dharmodas Ghose, a minor, mortgaged his property in favour of a moneylender, Brahmo Dutt, against the loan of Rs 20,000. Dutt's attorney, acting on behalf of him, was aware of Ghose's minority.{as throughout the transaction brahmo dutt was absent from calcutta}. Ghose, through his mother and guardian, sued Dutt claiming that the mortgage was void due to his minority. The Court of First Instance held in Ghose's favour, and on appeal, the High Court of Judicature at Fort William upheld that decision. Before the appeal to the Privy Council, Dutt died and the proceeding was continued by his heirs.

== Privy Council ==
Section 11 of the Contract Act, 1872 provides that for a person to have contracting capacity, they had to be of the age of majority, of sound mind, and not otherwise disqualified from contracting by law. However, this does not provide whether a minor's contract is void or voidable at the minor's option.

Confirming the original and appellate decisions, the Privy Council held that Ghose's contract was "absolutely void" from the beginning. At the same time, Ghose could not be compelled to return the loan money received under mortgage as he was not bound by the promise made at the time of contracting.

== Significance ==
The decision is good precedent in Indian contract law, and was re-affirmed by the Supreme Court in its 2014 decision in Mathai Mathai v Joseph Mary.

The holding that a minor's contract is "absolutely void" could lead to results which were against the minor's interests. Thus, High Courts interpreted the decision to allow enforcement of contracts made for their benefit and made by their guardians, within their competence as their guardians. The Privy Council itself upheld this interpretation in 1948.
