= Lord Collins (disambiguation) =

Lord Collins properly refers to Richard Collins, Baron Collins (1842–1911), an Anglo-Irish judge.

Lord Collins may also refer to—

- Ray Collins, Baron Collins of Highbury, a Labour member of the House of Lords and trade unionist
- Lawrence Collins, Baron Collins of Mapesbury (born 1941), a Justice of the Supreme Court of the United Kingdom
