= Arthur Crawford =

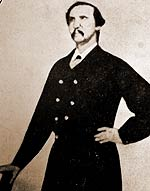
- Arthur Travers Crawford, the first Municipal Commissioner (1865-1871)
- Born: 1835; Patna, Bihar, Bengal Presidency
- Died: 1911 (aged 75–76); England
- Occupations: civil servant, author
- Known for: Municipal Commissioner of Mumbai (1865-1871)

Arthur Travers Crawford (1835–1911) was a British government employee and the first Municipal Commissioner and collector of Bombay (now Mumbai), India. Crawford was famous as an able administrator as well as for his allegedly, underhand financial dealings.

Crawford was son of James Henry Crawford and Charlotte Mary Anne Crawford.

Crawford acquired the Agri-Horticulture Society's gardens at Sewri in order to build the European cemetery in 1865. Crawford Market in South Mumbai was named after him. When he took over as Commissioner, water supply was scanty, garbage was piling up and the mortality rate was a high 40 per 1,000. Crawford cleaned the streets, fixed the drains and lowered the mortality rate by half from 35,000 to 18,000 over the next two years. However his plans greatly overshot the civic budget and he was accused of financial mismanagement after he refused to heed to warnings that the deficit was ever widening. While criticised by many, he was defended by lawyer Pherozeshah Mehta during the Municipal controversy circa 1870.

Later in his career it was alleged that Crawford had accepted bribes from mamlatdars (executive heads of a taluka). This prompted a fierce public debate led by Lokmanya Tilak and Gopal Krishna Gokhale. The subsequent inquiry, chaired by Judge Arthur Wilson of the Calcutta High Court, found Crawford (then the Commissioner of Bombay Presidency's Central Division), not guilty of accepting bribes but only of borrowing money from official subordinates. Crawford was subsequently removed from the Civil Service List and asked to return to London.

According to Govid Talwalkar's author of Gopal Krishna Gokhale: His Life and Times, a June 1890 Westminster Review article alleged that Crawford's illegal funds were transferred to Europe through a French bank. Then, as a decoy, he wrote two letters to his brother based in Bombay that he would commit suicide at Holkar Bridge in Poona (now Pune). Dressed as a tramp, he boarded the third-class compartment of a Bombay-bound train. While in a hotel near the docks, the police got wind of his presence and arrested him. Crawford had tried to buy a ticket to Colombo.

Back in London, he penned his memoirs on his life in India, titled Our Troubles in Poona and the Deccan which was published in 1897. He described many communities in the Bombay region along with their sketches. He meted out special harsh criticism on Brahmins. His fluency in Marathi ironically however led contemporary writer N. C. Kelkar to comment that Crawford could have passed off as a Chitpawan Brahmin had he donned a dhoti. Other books published by Crawford include Reminiscence of an Indian Police Officer, The Unrest in India and Legends of Konkan.
