= Stephen Henn-Collins =

The Honourable Sir Stephen Henn-Collins CBE

Justice of the High Court
- In office 1937–1948

The Honourable Sir Stephen Ogle Henn-Collins, CBE (14 September 1875 – 16 October 1958) was an English barrister and High Court judge.

== Biography ==
Stephen Ogle Collins was the younger son of the distinguished lawyer and law lord Richard Henn Collins, Baron Collins. (Stephen Collins later adapted his surname to Henn-Collins.) He was educated at Winchester College and New College, Oxford, where he took honours in Jurisprudence. He was called to the bar by the Middle Temple in 1899. Collins was a copyright specialist. He was also standing counsel for the Law Society, and junior common law counsel to the Admiralty. He was appointed a CBE in 1925 and took silk in 1932.

The enactment of the Matrimonial Causes Act 1937 greatly increased the volume of divorce cases in the Probate, Divorce and Admiralty Division of the High Court of Justice, which only had three judges at the time. As a consequence, the Supreme Court of Judicature (Amendment) Act 1937 authorized the appointment of two additional High Court judges. Henn-Collins was selected by Lord Hailsham to fill one of the two new positions and assigned to the Probate, Divorce and Admiralty Division, even though he was inexperienced in divorce matters and disliked them. He received the customary knighthood in December 1937.

In 1945, on the promotion of Mr Justice Tucker to the Court of Appeal, Henn-Collins was transferred to the King's Bench Division. He retired in 1948.

== Personal life ==
Henn-Collins married Agnes Julia Lambert in 1899; they had a son and three daughters.

In his private life, Henn-Collins had strong artistic interests, and was a skilled violin-maker, a hobby which "was the least expected in one of his Majesty's Judges".
