= John Atkinson, Baron Atkinson =

Irish politician

The Right Honourable The Lord Atkinson PC
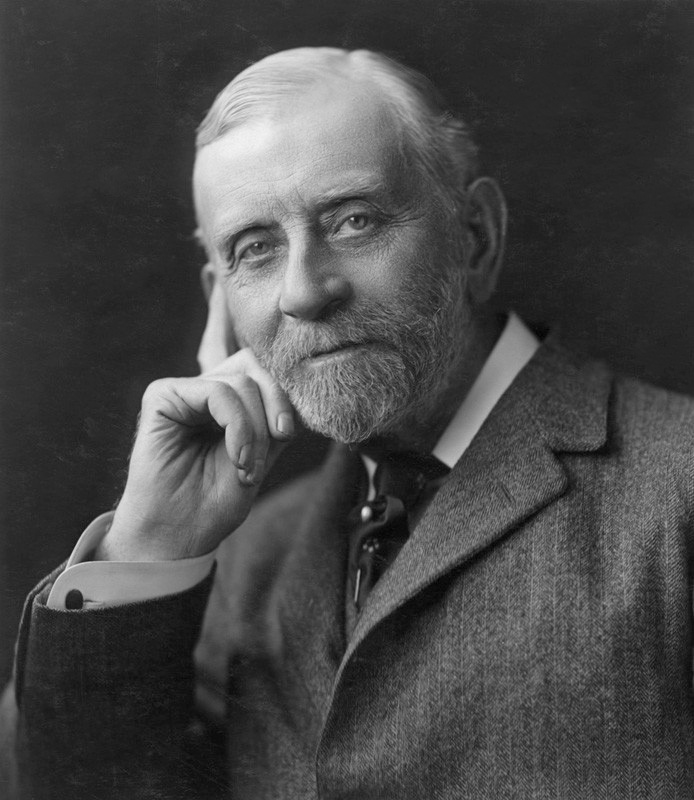
- The Lord Atkinson

Lord of Appeal in Ordinary
- In office 20 December 1905 – 5 February 1928
- Succeeded by: The Lord Atkin

Attorney-General for Ireland

Solicitor-General for Ireland

Personal details
- Born: 13 December 1844 Drogheda, County Louth, Ireland
- Died: 13 March 1932 (aged 87) London, England

John Atkinson, Baron Atkinson, PC (13 December 1844 – 13 March 1932) was an Irish politician and judge. He was a Lord of Appeal in Ordinary from 1905 to 1928.

== Early life and career ==
Atkinson was born at Drogheda, County Louth, the eldest son of Edward Atkinson, a physician, of Glenwilliam Castle, County Limerick and Skea House, Enniskillen, County Fermanagh, and his wife Rosetta.

He was educated at the Belfast Academy and later at Queen's College Galway, which he attended from 1858 to 1865. He won Junior Scholarships in the Science Division of the Faculty of Arts, 1858–9, 1859–60 and 1860–1. He was awarded the B.A. degree in mathematics with first-class honours in 1861, and pursued a varied postgraduate career – from initial study of the sciences (with Senior Scholarships in Mathematics, 1861–2, and Natural Philosophy, 1862–3) he moved into Law, gaining a first-class Diploma in Elementary Law in 1864. A further Senior Scholarship, this time in Law, followed, and he graduated with a first-class LL.B. in 1865. Throughout his university career, he was noted as an orator of distinction, and served as Auditor of the college's Literary and Debating Society for the 1862–63 session.

Atkinson was called to the Irish Bar in 1865 and appointed a Queen's Counsel in 1880 at the early age of 35. He practised as a QC on the Munster Circuit. He was elected a Bencher of the King's Inns in June 1885. In 1890, he was called to the English Bar by the Inner Temple, and was elected a Bencher there in 1906. Atkinson represented the Times Newspaper before the Parnell Commission in 1888.

== Political life ==
Atkinson was politically active throughout his career at the Bar, and in 1889 was appointed Solicitor-General for Ireland. He became Attorney-General for Ireland in 1892, and later that year was appointed a Privy Councillor. In January 1893, having left the office of Attorney-General, he called a motion at a Unionist meeting in County Fermanagh declaring renewed opposition to Home Rule. At a meeting in March of that year (1893) at Leinster Hall Atkinson declared that a breach in the Union between the United Kingdom and Ireland would mean an end to civil and religious liberty. In December 1893 he was selected to represent the Unionist Party in North Londonderry. His candidature was endorsed by Arthur Balfour, then leader of the House of Commons, with the words –"it is important that the loyalists of Ulster be represented by eloquent and able men". Atkinson was elected a Conservative M.P. for North Londonderry in 1895; upon his election, he was again appointed Attorney-General, an office he held for the next ten years. During this time, he was closely involved in the framing of many significant pieces of legislation, including the Irish Land Act, 1896, and the Local Government Act, 1898.

== Appointed as a law lord ==
On 19 December 1905, he was appointed to the House of Lords as a Lord of Appeal in Ordinary and life peer under the title Baron Atkinson, of Glenwilliam in the County of Limerick, the first Irish barrister to be appointed as a Law Lord directly from his practice at the bar – Judges John Fitzgerald and Michael Morris had served on the Irish Bench for many years before their respective appointments. For the title of his life peerage, he chose Glenwilliam, after Glenwilliam Castle in County Limerick, the home of his father. Atkinson's appointment, however, was not met with universal approval by his profession. As a former member of the cabinet he was seen as a political judge, however his industry and keen sense of justice came to be seen as a valuable addition to the bench. On his appointment as a Law Lord, he withdrew from active politics, limiting his contributions on political matters in the House of Lords to the discussion of Irish matters, such as the Irish Land Bill in 1909, to which he tabled several amendments. Atkinson retired as a judge in 1928, and died at his home at 39 Hyde Park Gate, London on 13 March 1932. A portrait by John St Helier Lander hangs in the Bar Room of King's Inns, Dublin.

== Arms ==
Coat of arms of John Atkinson, Baron Atkinson
Notes Granted by Sir Arthur Vicars, Ulster King of Arms, 5 December 1905 (arms and crest) and 19 February 1906. Crest On a wreath of the colours a falcon rising Proper belled and jessed Or holding in its beak a fleur-de-lys per pale Gules and Argent. Escutcheon Per pale Gules and Argent an eagle displayed with two heads counterchanged on a chief engrailed Ermine a rose Proper between two martlets Or. Supporters Dexter a figure of Justice Proper vested Argent semee of fleurs-de-lys Gules sinister an eagle Proper gorged with a collar flory counterflory and pendent therefrom a portcullis Or. Motto Virtute Et Valore

== Sources ==
- T.C. Tobias, 'Atkinson, John, Baron Atkinson (1844–1932)', rev. Sinéad Agnew, Oxford Dictionary of National Biography, Oxford University Press, 2004.
- Obituary, The Times, 14 March 1932. see also reply by Arthur Balfor on 15 March 1932.
- Hesilrige, Arthur G. M. (1921). Debrett's Peerage and Titles of courtesy. London: London: Dean & son, limited. p. 77.

Parliament of the United Kingdom
Preceded by Henry Lyle Mulholland	Member of Parliament for North Londonderry; 1895–1906	Succeeded by Hugh T. Barrie
Legal offices
Preceded by Dodgson Hamilton Madden	Solicitor-General for Ireland; 1890–1892	Succeeded by Edward Carson
Preceded by Dodgson Hamilton Madden	Attorney-General for Ireland; 1892	Succeeded by The Macdermot
Preceded by The Macdermot	Attorney-General for Ireland; 1895–1905	Succeeded by James Campbell
