= James Robertson, Baron Robertson =

British politician and judge (1845–1909)

The Right Honourable The Lord Robertson PC, FRSE
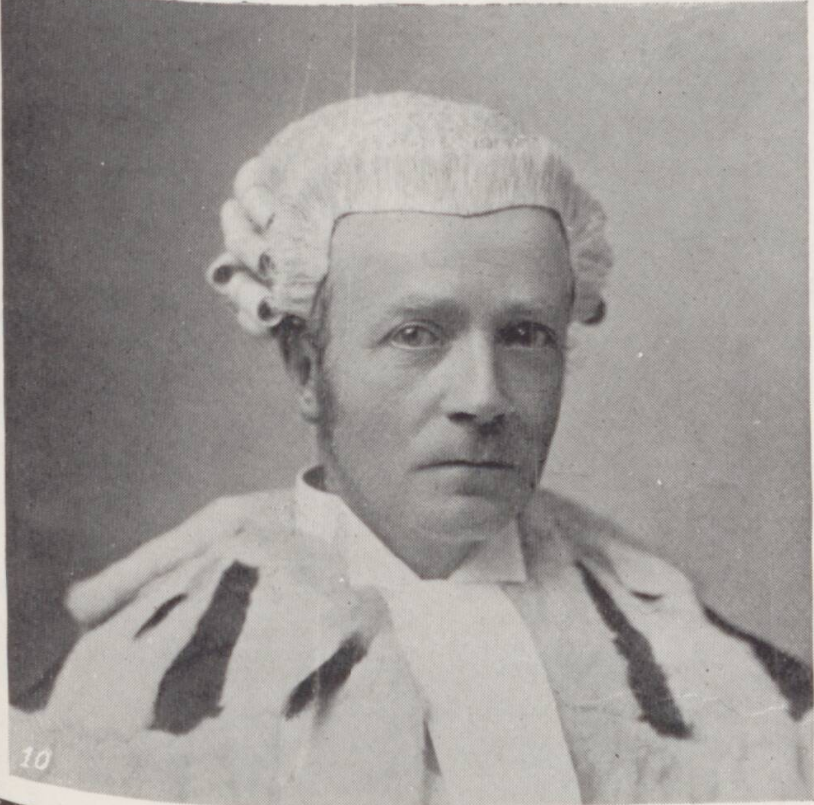

Lord of Appeal in Ordinary

Personal details
- Born: James Patrick Bannerman Robertson

James Patrick Bannerman Robertson, Baron Robertson, PC, FRSE (19 August 1845 – 1 February 1909), was a Scottish judge and Conservative politician.

== Life ==
Robertson was born in the manse at Forteviot, the son of Helen Bannerman, daughter of Rev. J. Bannerman of Cargill, Perthshire and Rev. Robert John Robertson, minister of Forteviot, Perthshire.

He was educated at the High School in Edinburgh then studied law at the University of Edinburgh graduating with an MA in 1864. He passed to the Scottish bar in 1867. He was president of the Juridical Society 1869–70. He became a Queen's Counsel in 1885.

Robertson stood unsuccessfully for parliament at Linlithgowshire in 1880. At the 1885 general election he was elected Conservative Member of Parliament for Buteshire and held the seat until 1891. He was appointed Solicitor General for Scotland in 1885 and again in 1886 and was appointed Lord Advocate in 1888 and was made a Privy Counsellor in the same year. He carried the Local Government (Scotland) Act 1889.

He was elected a Fellow of the Royal Society of Edinburgh in 1886. His proposers were John McLaren, Lord McLaren, Alexander Forbes Irvine, Peter Guthrie Tait and Sir William Turner. In 1890 the University of Edinburgh awarded him an honorary doctorate (LLD).

Robertson gave up his seat when he was appointed Lord President of the Court of Session in 1891, taking the judicial courtesy title of Lord Robertson. He was appointed a Lord of Appeal in Ordinary on 14 November 1899 and created life peer as Baron Robertson, of Forteviot in the County of Perth. He was Rector of the University of Edinburgh in 1893 and was also Chairman of the Irish University Commission. At this time he lived at 19 Drumsheugh Gardens in Edinburgh's West End.

In 1899, he was a member of the Judicial Committee of the Privy Council. He was a Trustee of the Board of Manufactures in Scotland, from which he resigned in 1899.

In later life he retired to live in Muchalls Castle in Aberdeenshire.

He died on 1 February 1909 at Cap Martin on the south coast of France near Monaco, aged 74. He is buried in Elmstead in Kent.

== Family ==
Robertson married Philadelphia Mary Lucy Fraser, daughter of W. N. Fraser of Tornaveen, Aberdeenshire in 1872. They had one daughter and two sons.

== Arms ==
Coat of arms of James Robertson, Baron Robertson
Crest A dexter arm erect Proper charged with an Ermine spot the hand holding an Imperial crown also Proper. Escutcheon Gules a fess Ermine between two wolves' heads erased in chief and a banner displayed in base Argent thereon a canton Azure charged with a saltire of the third. Supporters On either side a wolf Argent charged on the shoulder with a thistle and standing on a fasces both Proper. Motto Virtutis Gloria Merces (Glory Is The Recompense of Valour)

Parliament of the United Kingdom
Preceded by Charles Dalrymple	Member of Parliament for Buteshire; 1885 – 1891	Succeeded by Andrew Murray
Legal offices
Preceded by Alexander Asher	Solicitor General for Scotland; 1885–1886	Succeeded by Alexander Asher
Preceded by Alexander Asher	Solicitor General for Scotland; 1886–1888	Succeeded by Moir Tod Stormonth Darling
Preceded by John Macdonald	Lord Advocate; 1888–1891	Succeeded by Charles Pearson
Preceded by Lord Glencorse	Lord Justice General; 1891–1899	Succeeded by Lord Balfour
Academic offices
Preceded by George Goschen	Rector of the University of Edinburgh; 1893–1896	Succeeded by Lord Balfour of Burleigh
