= Ford North =

English barrister and judge

The Right Honourable Sir Ford North FRS FRMS
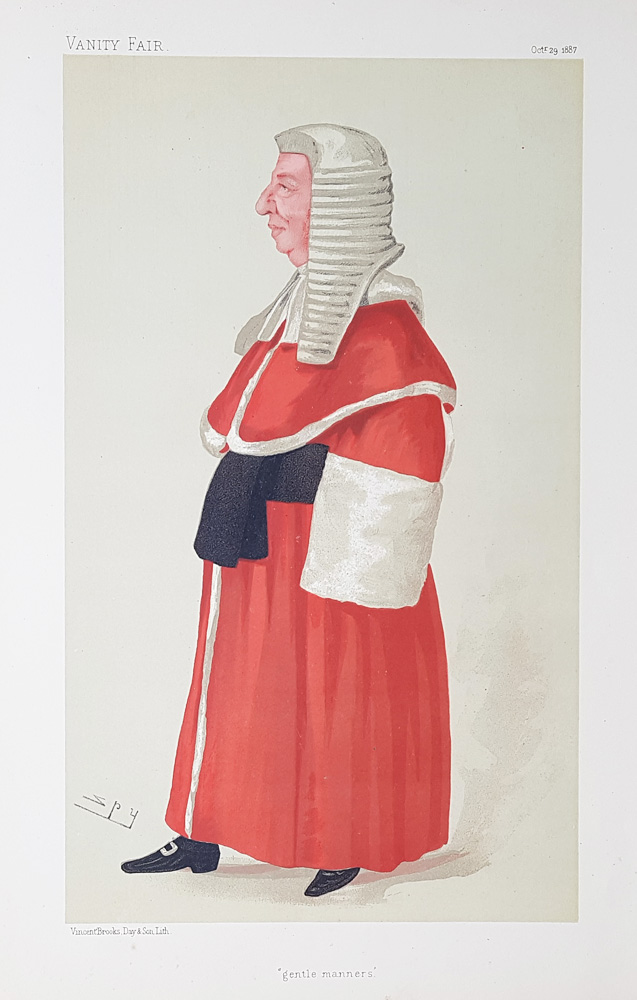
- "Gentle Manners." Caricature by Spy, 1887

Justice of the High Court
- In office 1 November 1881 – 10 June 1900

Personal details
- Born: Liverpool, England
- Education: University College, Oxford

Sir Ford North PC FRS FRMS (10 January 1830 – 12 October 1913), was an English lawyer and judge.

== Biography ==
North was born in Liverpool. He was the eldest son of John North, a solicitor, and Ellen Haworth. In 1857, he married Elizabeth William Mann.

North was educated at Winchester College and then University College, Oxford. He began his legal studies at the Inner Temple in 1853, and was called to the Bar in 1856. Practising as a barrister, he was named Queen's Counsel in 1877, and was elected a bencher in 1881.

He was appointed a judge of the High Court of Justice in 1881, and was knighted. North was sworn in before the Lord Chancellor, Lord Selborne, at his country residence, Blackmoor, Petersfield. Justice North sat originally in the Queen’s Bench Division of the High Court, where he presided over the blasphemy trial of George William Foote; when he sentenced Foote to a lengthy term of imprisonment, Foote responded "My Lord, I thank you. It is worthy of your creed".

North transferred to the Chancery Division in 1883. He resigned from the Court in 1900. On 3 March 1900 he was sworn a member of the Privy Council, which entitled him to sit on the Judicial Committee of the Privy Council.

He was elected a Fellow of the Royal Society in 1900. Also, in 1900 it was reported that the Queen had granted him a life annuity of £3500.

== Personal life and death ==
North was predeceased by his wife in 1907. He died at Laggan House, Carron, in the county of Moray, in Scotland, on 12 October 1913.
