= Arthur Wilson (judge) =

British judge in India and Britain (1837–1915)

The Right Honourable Sir Arther Wilson KCIE
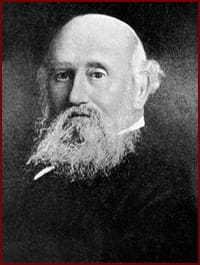
- Born: 1837
- Died: 28 December 1915 (aged 77–78); Woking, Surrey, England
- Occupations: Judge, lawyer, academic

Sir Arthur Wilson, KCIE, PC (1837– 28 December 1915) was an English lawyer and judge. After practising as a barrister in the English courts, he served as a judge of the High Court of Calcutta in colonial India, and was later a member of the Judicial Committee of the Privy Council.

== Career ==
Wilson was called to the Bar by the Inner Temple in 1862 and rapidly advanced in the profession. One judge of the English High Court, Lord Justice Mathew, said that Wilson would certainly have been raised to the bench in Britain, had he not accepted an appointment to the High Court of Calcutta in 1878 (at that time, known as the High Court of Judicature, Fort Williams, Bengal).

In 1880, Wilson was elected Vice-Chancellor of the University of Calcutta, a position he held until 1884.

In 1888–89, Wilson was president of a Commission of Inquiry which sat at Poona, to investigate corruption allegations which had been made against Arthur Crawford, the Commissioner of the Central Division of the Bombay Presidency. The lengthy hearings attracted considerable public attention in both India and Britain. After sixty-seven public sittings, the Commission found Crawford not guilty of the more serious charges of taking bribes, but guilty of borrowing money from his Indian subordinates.

In 1892, Wilson resigned his position on the Calcutta High Court and returned to Britain. He was appointed Legal Adviser and Solicitor to the Indian Office, and in 1898 was appointed a Knight Commander of the Order of the Indian Empire (KCIE).

In March 1902, Wilson was sworn a member of the Privy Council, and the following month took his place on the Judicial Committee of the Privy Council, at that time the highest court for the Empire. By that time, he was physically weak, having trouble even walking across the room at committee meetings, but he retained his intellectual vigour. He sat on the Judicial Committee for nine years, retiring in 1911.

Wilson died on 28 December 1915, at the Moorings, Heathside, Woking.

== Personal life ==
Wilson had a family of two sons and one daughter. Both sons were in the Army. One of them drowned while crossing a river in India, and the other was killed campaigning in South Africa.
