= Richard Collins, Baron Collins =

British judge (1842–1911)

The Right Honourable The Lord Collins PC
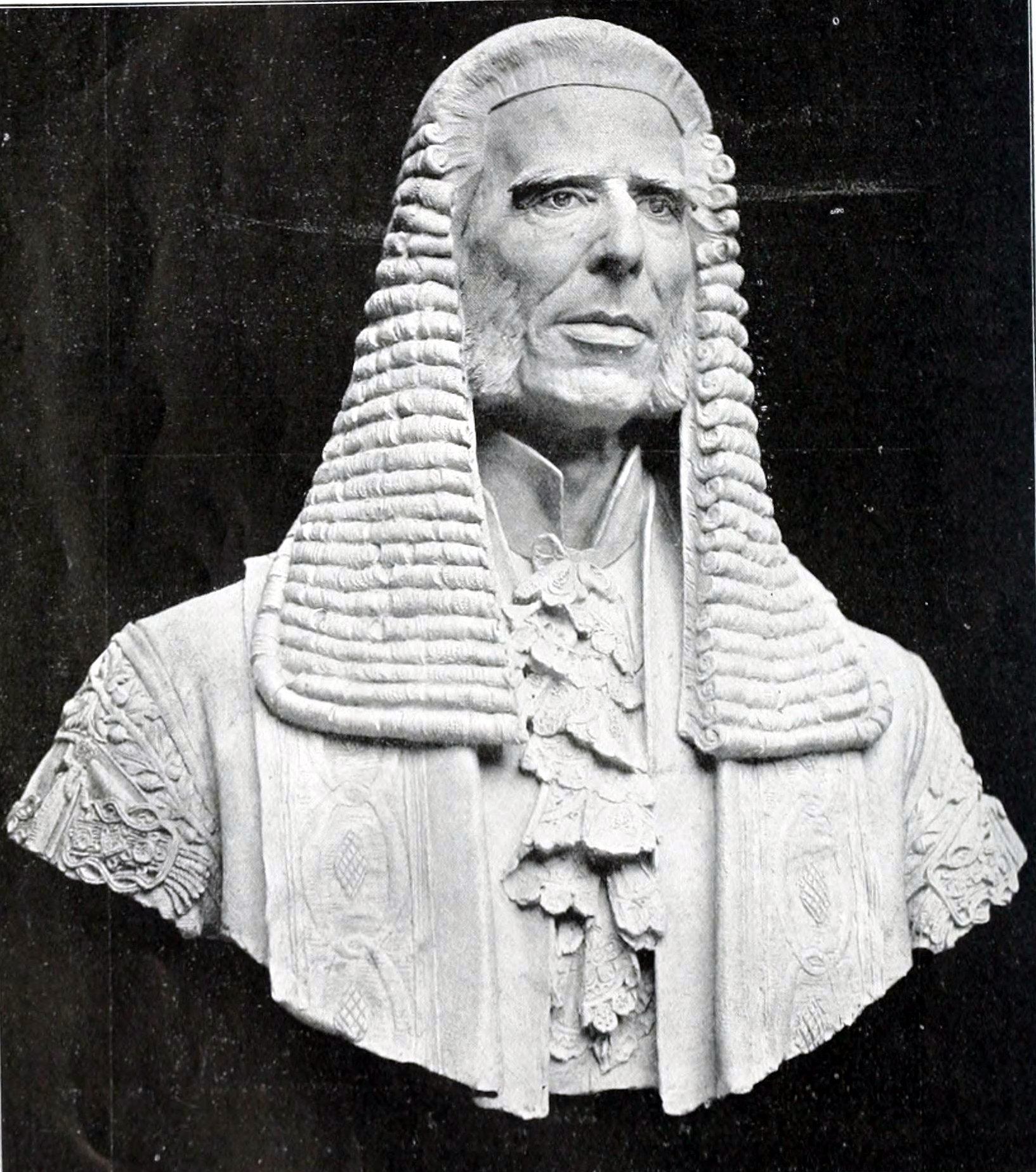
- Francis Derwent Wood's Lord Henn-Collins

Lord of Appeal in Ordinary
- In office 1907–1910

Master of the Rolls
- In office 1901–1907
- Preceded by: Sir Archibald Levin Smith
- Succeeded by: The Lord Cozens-Hardy

Lord Justice of Appeal

Justice of the High Court

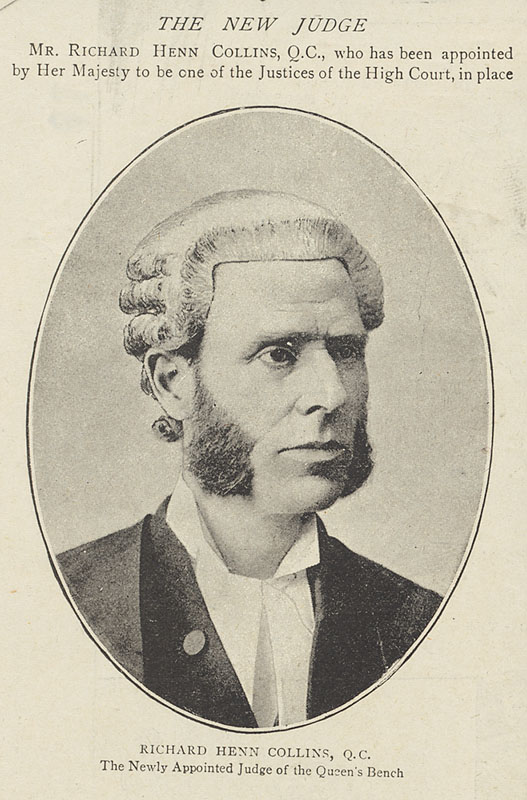
Lord Collins

Richard Henn Collins, Baron Collins PC (31 January 1842 – 3 January 1911) was an Anglo-Irish lawyer and judge.

== Life ==
Born in Dublin, Collins was educated at the Royal School Dungannon and Trinity College Dublin (where he was elected a Scholar), and Downing College, Cambridge.

In 1867, he was called to the English bar and joined the northern circuit. He was made a Queen's Counsel in 1883 and a judge in 1891.

Having made a Lord Justice of Appeal in 1897, he was appointed also to the Privy Council. In October 1901, Collins became Master of the Rolls after the death of Sir Archibald Smith, and the following month was appointed to the accompanying post of Chairman of the Historical Manuscripts Commission. He received the honorary degree LL.D. from the University of Cambridge in May 1902. On 6 March 1907 he was appointed a Lord of Appeal in Ordinary, receiving additionally a life peerage with the title Baron Collins, of Kensington in the County of London. He resigned as Lord of Appeal on 9 January 1910.

Lord Collins was judge of the trial of Oscar Wilde's libel prosecution against the Marquess of Queensberry on 3 April 1895 (as noted in "The Trials of Oscar Wilde", by H. Montgomery Hyde (1962) at p97). He represented Great Britain on the Venezuela Boundary Commission, established to adjudicate in the boundary dispute between British Guiana and Venezuela in 1899. In 1904, he was chairman of the commission which investigated the case of Adolf Beck.

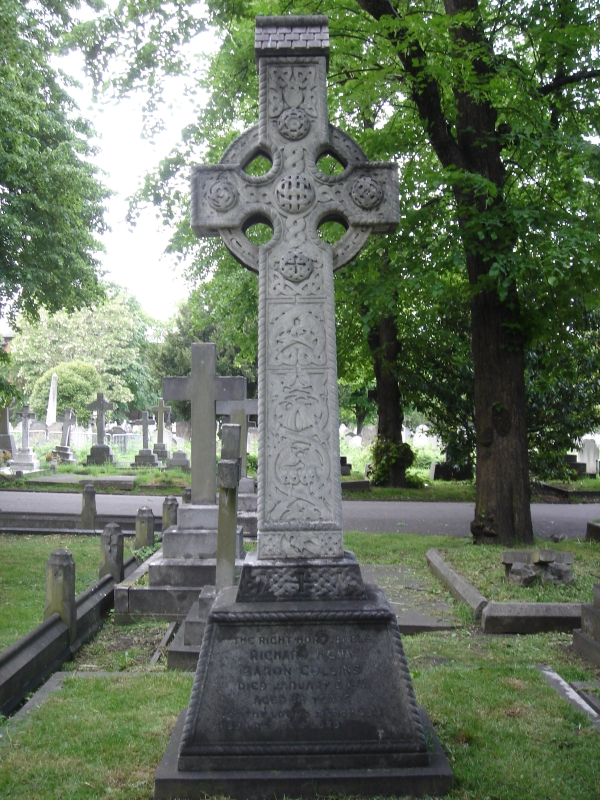
Funerary monument, Brompton Cemetery, London

He died at Hove, East Sussex on 3 January 1911.

== Family ==
His wife, Jane Ogle, Lady Collins (d. 1934), is buried in Brompton Cemetery. His younger son, Sir Stephen Henn-Collins, became a High Court judge.

== Cases ==
- Sumpter v Hedges
- Wilde v Queensbury
- Chandler v Webster
- Henderson v Arthur

Legal offices
Preceded by Sir Archibald Smith	Master of the Rolls; 1901–1907	Succeeded by Sir Herbert Cozens-Hardy
