= List of Canadian appeals to the Judicial Committee of the Privy Council, 1890–1899 =

List of Canadian appeals to the JCPC (1890–1899)

This page lists all cases of the Judicial Committee of the Privy Council originating in Canada, and decided in the years 1890 to 1899.

From 1867 to 1949, the JCPC was the highest court of appeal for Canada (and, separately, for Newfoundland). During this period, its decisions on Canadian appeals were binding precedent on all Canadian courts, including the Supreme Court of Canada. Any decisions from this era that the Supreme Court of Canada has not overruled since gaining appellate supremacy in 1949 remain good law, and continue to bind all Canadian courts other than the Supreme Court.

The Parliament of Canada abolished appeals to the JCPC of criminal cases in 1933 and civil cases in 1949. Ongoing cases that had begun before those dates remained appealable to the JCPC. The final JCPC ruling on a Canadian case was rendered in 1959, in Ponoka-Calmar Oils v Wakefield.

== 1890–1899 ==
Case name	Citation	Subject (Exact Text from Judgment)	Judges (Author of decision in bold)	Appeal Allowed or Dismissed	On Appeal From
Booth and others v. Ratté	[1890] UKPC 2	"The suit to which this appeal relates was brought by the Respondent in the Chancery Division of the High Court of Justice of the Province of Ontario against the Appellants, who are severally owners of saw mills in the city of Ottawa, on the Ottawa river."	Lord Halsbury, Lord Chancellor; Lord Watson; Sir Barnes Peacock; **Sir Richard Couch**	Appeal dismissed	Court of Appeal for Ontario
La Banque d'Hochelaga and another v. Murray and others	[1890] UKPC 26	"This is an appeal from judgments of the Court of Queen's Bench, in the Province of Quebec (Appeal Side), reversing judgments of the Superior Court for Lower Canada, Province of Quebec, District Montreal. In May 1883 the Appellants, La Banque d'Hochelaga, obtained in the Superior Court a judgment against the Pioneer Beetroot Sugar Company, Limited, for $40,800.80, with interest and costs, and on or about the 30th May 1883 the said Appellants, under the provisions of the Quebec Statute, 31 Vict., c. 25, issued a writ of execution upon the said judgment, to which, on 25th June 1883, the Sheriff made a return of nulla bona."	Lord Halsbury, Lord Chancellor; Lord Bramwell; **Sir Barnes Peacock**; Sir Richard Couch	Appeal allowed in part	Quebec Court of Queen's Bench (Appeal Side)
McLeod v. McNab	[1891] UKPC 28	"Their Lordships do not think it necessary to trouble the Counsel for the Respondents. The facts of this case, so far as it is necessary to state them by way of introduction to the judgment of this Board, are these:— The testator, Mr. Alexander McLeod, made his will on the 17th July 1880. That will contained a residuary bequest to Dalhousie College. The Appellant is the executor of Archibald McLeod deceased, who was the only surviving brother and heir-at-law of the testator, and would be entitled to any estate not disposed of by the testator. He says that the residuary bequest to Dalhousie College was revoked by a codicil of the 17th June 1882."	Lord Hobhouse; Lord Macnaghten; **Lord Hannen**; Sir Richard Couch	Appeal dismissed	Supreme Court of Nova Scotia
Robinson v. The Canadian Pacific Railway	[1891] UKPC 34	"Judgment of the Lords of the Judicial Committee of the Privy Council on the Petition of Dame Agnes Robinson for special leave to appeal in the matter of intituled Robinson v. the Canadian Pacific Railway, from the Supreme Court of Canada; delivered July 25th, 1891."	**Lord Watson**; Lord Hannen; Lord Macnaghten; Sir Richard Couch	Leave to appeal allowed.	Supreme Court of Canada
Huntington v. Attrill	[1892] UKPC 7	"The appellant, in June 1880, became a creditor for money lent to the Rockaway Beach Improvement Company, Limited, which carried on business in the State of New York, being incorporated pursuant to Chapter 611 of the State laws of 1875. Section 21 of the Act provides that, 'If any certificate or report made, or public notice given, by the officers of any such corporation, shall be false in any material representation, all the officers who shall have signed the same shall be jointly and severally liable for all the debts of the corporation contracted while they are officers thereof'."	Lord Halsbury, Lord Chancellor; **Lord Watson**; Lord Bramwell; Lord Hobhouse; Lord Morris; Lord Shand	Appeal allowed	Court of Appeal for Ontario
The Liquidators of the Maritime Bank of Canada v. The Receiver General of New Brunswick	[1892] UKPC 34	"This appeal is brought by special leave in a suit which followed upon a case submitted for the opinion of the Supreme Court of the Province of New Brunswick, by the Appellants, the Liquidators of the Maritime Bank of the Dominion of Canada, in the interest of unsecured creditors of the Bank, on the one side, and by the Receiver General of the Province, claiming to represent Her Majesty, on the other."	**Lord Watson**; Lord Hobhouse; Lord Macnaghten; Lord Morris; Sir Richard Couch; Lord Shand	Appeal dismissed	Supreme Court of Canada
The Palgrave Gold Mining Company v. McMillan	[1892] UKPC 36	"The Appellants hold a lease from the Crown of certain gold mines, which extend over the whole of a small island situate in Isaac's Harbour, and called Hurricane Point. The Respondent is the owner of a plot of land in the island. The question is as to the validity of an award made for the purpose of estimating the damages to be paid to the owners by the lessees under the provisions of the Statute, Chapter 7, of the Revised Statutes of Nova Scotia, Fifth Series."	**Lord Hobhouse**; Lord Morris; Lord Hannen; Sir Richard Couch; Lord Shand	Appeal allowed	Supreme Court of Nova Scotia
Robinson v. The Canadian Pacific Railway	[1892] UKPC 37	"This is an action of damages brought before the Superior Court of the Province of Quebec by the Appellant, the widow of Patrick Flynn, on her own behalf and as tutrix of their minor child, upon the allegation that the death of her husband, which occurred on the 13th November 1883, was the result of bodily injuries sustained by him on the 27th August 1882, whilst he was in the service of the respondents, through the negligence of their employés."	**Lord Watson**; Lord Macnaghten; Lord Morris; Lord Hannen; Sir Richard Couch; Lord Shand	Appeal allowed	Supreme Court of Canada
The Ontario Bank v. William George Murray and others	[1892] UKPC 41	"This is an appeal from the judgment of the Superior Court of Quebec, sitting in Review. By agreement dated the 1st November 1881, and made between the Montreal and Sorel Railway Company, of the one part, and Alexander Murray and John Rankin, of the other part, in consideration of Alexander Murray and John Rankin agreeing to endorse and discount upon their credit the promissory notes of the Railway Company to the amount of 300,000 dollars, the Railway Company agreed to re-pay the said sum, and to transfer to Murray and Rankin 1,500 first mortgage sterling bonds of 100l. each bearing interest at the rate of 6 per cent.; and it was provided by the agreement that Murray and Rankin should have the right to transfer the said bonds to the persons or bank with whom they might discount the notes of Railway Company, by way of collateral security for the payment thereof."	Lord Watson; **Lord Morris**; Sir Richard Couch; Lord Shand	Appeal dismissed	Quebec Superior Court
The City of Winnipeg v. Barrett	[1892] UKPC 42	"These two appeals were heard together. In the one case the City of Winnipeg appeals from a judgment of the Supreme Court of Canada reversing a judgment of the Court of Queen's Bench for Manitoba – in the other from a subsequent judgment of the Court of Queen's Bench for Manitoba following the judgment of the Supreme Court. The judgments under appeal quashed certain by-laws of the City of Winnipeg which authorized assessments for school purposes in pursuance of "The Public Schools Act, 1890", a statute of Manitoba to which Roman Catholics and members of the Church of England alike take exception. The views of the Roman Catholic Church were maintained by Mr. Barrett; the case of the Church of England was put forward by Mr. Logan."	Lord Watson; **Lord Macnaghten**; Lord Morris; Lord Hannen; Sir Richard Couch; Lord Shand	Appeal allowed	Supreme Court of Canada
The City of Winnipeg v. Logan	[1892] UKPC 43	"These two appeals were heard together. In the one case the City of Winnipeg appeals from a judgment of the Supreme Court of Canada reversing a judgment of the Manitoba Court of Queen's Bench – in the other from a subsequent judgment of the Manitoba Court of Queen's Bench following the judgment of the Supreme Court. The judgments under appeal quashed certain by-laws of the City of Winnipeg which authorized assessments for school purposes in pursuance of "The Public Schools Act, 1890", a statute of Manitoba to which Roman Catholics and members of the Church of England alike take exception. The views of the Roman Catholic Church were maintained by Mr. Barrett; the case of the Church of England was put forward by Mr. Logan."	Lord Watson; **Lord Macnaghten**; Lord Morris; Lord Hannen; Sir Richard Couch; Lord Shand	Appeal allowed	Manitoba Court of Queen's Bench
Smart v. Smart	[1892] UKPC 44	"This case belongs to a class in which courts of justice have repeatedly expressed their reluctance to interfere by reason of the great difficulty of knowing what arrangements are best for a family where the normal family arrangements have been disturbed; and yet in which interference is sometimes found necessary to prevent injury to wives or children. Their Lordships approach it with a strong sense of the delicacy of the jurisdiction, though the facts are such as to leave no material doubt of the duty which lies upon them."	Lord Watson; **Lord Hobhouse**; Lord Morris; Sir Richard Couch; Lord Shand	Appeal dismissed	Court of Appeal for Ontario
The Connecticut Fire Insurance Company v. Kavanagh	[1892] UKPC 45	"In this case the argument addressed to their Lordships was not confined to the points which were submitted for the decision of the Courts below. Before dealing with these controverted questions, whether old or new, it will be convenient to notice the facts which are not now in dispute."	**Lord Watson**; Lord Hobhouse; Lord Shand	Appeal dismissed	Quebec Court of Queen's Bench (Appeal Side)
Labrador Company v. The Queen	[1892] UKPC 51	"The subject matter of these appeals is a tract of country on the northern shore of the Gulf of the St. Lawrence, extending from Cape Cormorant to the Strait of Belle Isle, a distance of more than 400 miles, with a depth of six miles."	Lord Watson; Lord Hobhouse; Lord Macnaghten; Lord Morris; **Lord Hannen**	Appeal dismissed	Quebec Court of Queen's Bench (Appeal Side)
The London and Canadian Loan Agency Company Limited v. Duggan	[1893] UKPC 40	"The controversy between the parties to this Appeal, which has occasioned much difference of opinion in the Courts below, relates to 798 shares of the Land Security Company of Toronto, of which 160 were old shares fully paid up, and 638 were new shares upon which 20 per cent. had been paid."	Lord Herschell, Lord Chancellor; **Lord Watson**; Lord Halsbury; Lord Hobhouse; Lord Macnaghten; Lord Morris; Lord Shand; Sir Richard Couch	Appeal allowed	Supreme Court of Canada
The Toronto Street Railway Company v. The Corporation of Toronto	[1893] UKPC 44	"This is an appeal from a judgment or order of the Court of Appeal for Ontario dated the 17th January 1893, dismissing the appeal of the present Appellants from an order of the Chancery Division of the High Court of Justice for that Province dated the 5th April 1892 which dismissed the Appellants' motion to set aside or refer back an award to certain arbitrators."	The Earl of Selborne; Lord Hobhouse; Lord Macnaghten; **Sir Richard Couch**	Appeal dismissed	Court of Appeal for Ontario
Ruggles and others v. Green	[1893] UKPC 45	"The sole question arising on this appeal relates to the order in which certain creditors of the Grand Southern Railway Company are to be paid. The Company has become insolvent; its property has been sold, and the assets are being distributed. Lew Green, the Plaintiff in the suit, claims to be paid 50,000 dollars in priority to the Defendants, who are holders of the Company's bonds, by virtue of an agreement into which the Defendants entered for the purpose of raising money. There is some complication in the history of the Company's affairs, but all that is necessary to show the nature of the agreement is to be found on the face of the agreement itself."	The Earl of Selborne; **Lord Hobhouse**; Lord Macnaghten; Sir Richard Couch	Appeal dismissed	Supreme Court of New Brunswick
Municipality of Pictou v. Geldert	[1893] UKPC 48	"The Plaintiff in this case resides within the Municipality of Pictou, and he sues the Corporation for neglect of its duty to repair a bridge, whereby severe injuries were caused to the Plaintiff."	Lord Herschell, Lord Chancellor; Lord Watson; Lord Halsbury; **Lord Hobhouse**; Lord Macnaghten; Lord Morris; Lord Shand; Sir Richard Couch	Appeal allowed	Supreme Court of Nova Scotia
The Corporation of Raleigh v. S.A. Williams and another	[1893] UKPC 49	"The Respondents who were Plaintiffs in the action sued the municipality of the Township of Raleigh claiming damages for injury caused by flooding to certain lands in the occupation of the respondent Sarah Ann Williams and also asking for a mandamus to prevent recurrence of the injury."	The Earl of Selborne; Lord Hobhouse; **Lord Macnaghten**; Sir Richard Couch	Appeal allowed	Supreme Court of Canada
Tennant v. The Union Bank of Canada	[1893] UKPC 53	"Christie Kerr & Co., sawmillers and lumberers at Bradford, in the Province of Ontario, became insolvent in April 1889. The Union Bank of Canada, Respondents in this Appeal, subsequently took possession of and removed a quantity of lumber which was stored in the yard of the firm at Bradford. This action was brought against the Respondents in December 1889, for damages in respect of their alleged conversion of the lumber, by Mickle Dyment and Son, personal creditors of the insolvent firm, in the name of James Tennant, as assignee or trustee of the firm's estate, by whom they were duly authorized to sue, in his name, for their own exclusive use and benefit."	Present at the first argument: **Lord Watson**; Lord Hobhouse; Lord Morris; Sir Richard Couch; Lord Shand Present at the second argument: Lord Herschell, Lord Chancellor; Lord Watson; Lord Hobhouse; Lord Macnaghten; Lord Morris; Lord Shand; Sir Richard Couch	Appeal dismissed	Court of Appeal for Ontario
Attorney General of Ontario v. Attorney General for the Dominion of Canada	[1894] UKPC 13	"This appeal is presented by the Attorney-General of Ontario against a decision of the Court of Appeal of that province. The decision complained of was an answer given to a question referred to that Court by the Lieutenant-Governor of the province in pursuance of an Order in Council. The question was as follows:– 'Had the Legislature of Ontario jurisdiction to enact the 9th Section of the Revised Statutes of Ontario, chapter 124, and entitled An Act respecting Assignments and Preferences by Insolvent Persons?' "	**Lord Herschell, Lord Chancellor**; Lord Watson; Lord Macnaghten; Lord Shand; Sir Richard Couch	Appeal allowed	Ontario Court of Appeal
Dame Georgina Mussen and others v. The Canada Atlantic Railway Company	[1894] UKPC 24	"The Respondents in this Appeal, the Canada Atlantic Railway Company, were enabled by certain statutory powers to make a line of railway running through the District of Montreal. Amongst other lands required by them for the purposes of their railway was certain land in the said district, the property of one William Norris. The Company made an offer to Norris of the sum of $1,600 as damages and compensation for the land intended to be taken, and in the event of the offer not being accepted, they named their arbitrator. Norris declined the offer and named his arbitrator. The arbitrators were unable to agree upon a third arbitrator, and the Company applied to the Superior Court, according to the provisions of the Railway Act (51 Vict. c. 29) to name one. This the Court did."	Lord Hobhouse; Lord Ashbourne; Lord Macnaghten; **Sir Richard Couch**	Appeal dismissed	Quebec Court of Queen's Bench (Appeal Side)
David Hoggan v. The Esquimalt and Nanaimo Railway Company	[1894] UKPC 29	"This is an appeal from a judgement of the Supreme Court of Canada, affirming a judgment of the Full Court of British Columbia, which had affirmed a judgment of Mr. Justice Walkem."	**Lord Herschell, Lord Chancellor**; Lord Hobhouse; Lord Macnaghten; Lord Shand; Sir Richard Couch	Appeal dismissed	Supreme Court of Canada
The Winnipeg Street Railway Company v. The Winnipeg Electric Street Railway Company and another	[1894] UKPC 37	"The first question raised in this appeal depends upon the construction of a deed of Indenture, which was made, on the 7th July 1882, between the Mayor and Council of the City of Winnipeg, of the first part, and the Appellants who will hereafter be referred to as 'the Company,' of the second part.	Lord Herschell, Lord Chancellor; **Lord Watson**; Lord Macnaghten; Sir Richard Couch	Appeal dismissed	Manitoba Court of Queen's Bench
Henri T. Déchène v. The City of Montreal	[1894] UKPC 47	"The Respondent Corporation are authorized by Section 101 of 37 Vict. (Quebec) cap. 51, to make an annual appropriation for the amounts necessary to meet the expenses of municipal administration during the current year. By the same clause, it is enacted that, 'such appropriation shall never exceed the amount of the receipts of the preceding year, added to the balance of the said receipts which have not been expended'."	**Lord Watson**; Lord Hobhouse; Lord Macnaghten; Lord Morris; Lord Shand; Sir Richard Couch	Appeal dismissed	Quebec Court of Queen's Bench (Appeal Side)
Quebec Central Railway Company v. Robertson	[1894] UKPC 51	"By an Act 49-50 Vict. cap. 82 of the Legislature of the Province of Quebec, passed on the 21st June 1886, the Charter of the Quebec Central Railway Company was amended by authorising the provisional directors of the Company named in the Act to issue 3,000 prior lien bonds of 100l. sterling each, payable in 20 years, to be a first charge on the property of the Company, and providing that upon the coming into force of the Act the powers of the directors should cease, and the affairs of the Company be administered by a board of provisional directors consisting of the persons named therein, until a permanent board of directors should be elected as was provided."	Lord Watson; Lord Hobhouse; Lord Macnaghten; **Sir Richard Couch**	Appeal allowed	Quebec Court of Queen's Bench (Appeal Side)
Brophy and others v. The Attorney-General of Manitoba	[1895] UKPC 1	"In the year 1890 two Acts were passed by the Legislature of Manitoba relating to education. One of these created a Department of Education and an 'Advisory Board'. The Board was to consist of seven members, four of whom were to be appointed by the Department of Education, two to be elected by the Public and High School teachers of the Province, and one to be appointed by the University Council. The Advisory Board were empowered (amongst other things) to authorise text books for the use of pupils and to prescribe the form of religious exercises to be used in schools."	**Lord Herschell, Lord Chancellor**; Lord Watson; Lord Macnaghten; Lord Shand	Appeal allowed in part	Supreme Court of Canada
Felix Hamelin and Thomas Ayer v. Thomas Bannerman, Alexander Bannerman, and Mary Ann Bannerman	[1895] UKPC 3	"The Appellants Hamelin and Ayer were, in 1881, proprietors of land lying on both sides of the North River, within the town of Lachute. They were also owners of the whole water power derivable from a pool or reservoir formed by the erection of a dam across the channel of the river."	**Lord Watson**; Lord Hobhouse; Lord Macnaghten; Lord Morris; Sir Richard Couch	Appeal dismissed	Quebec Court of Queen's Bench (Appeal Side)
The Honourable Thomas Chase Casgrain v. The Atlantic and North-West Railway Company and the City of Montreal	[1895] UKPC 7	"In this case, their Lordships heard a very full argument upon a great variety of questions. They have not found it necessary to decide all of these question; but they have thought it right to express their opinion upon some points the decision of which is not, in the view which they take, necessary to the disposal of the appeal."	Lord Herschell, Lord Chancellor; **Lord Watson**; Lord Macnaghten; Lord Shand; Lord Davey	Appeal dismissed	Quebec Court of Queen's Bench (Appeal Side)
Alexandre and others v. Brassard and others	[1895] UKPC 8	"The question in this case relates to the canonical erection and the civil recognition of a new parish in the district of Ibberville in the province of Quebec called St. Blaise which has been formed by the dis-memberment of three old parishes, St. Jean l'Evangéliste, St. Marguerite de Blairfindie, and St. Valetin."	Lord Herschell, Lord Chancellor; Lord Watson; Lord Hobhouse; **Lord Macnaghten**; Lord Shand	Appeal dismissed	Quebec Court of Queen's Bench (Appeal Side)
The Atlantic and North-West Railway Company v. Wood and others	[1895] UKPC 10	"The appeal in this case is presented against a judgment of the Court of Queen's Bench of Lower Canada, reversing a judgment of the Superior Court in the District of Montreal. The subject of the litigation is an award in an arbitration under the Canadian Railway Act of 1888 (51 Vict. c. 29), by which the majority of the arbitrators awarded a sum of $16,308 as compensation for land taken and injury done to the property of the Respondents by the Appellant Company, in the exercise of their statutory powers by the making of a railroad passing through the City of Montreal."	Lord Herschell, Lord Chancellor; Lord Watson; Lord Macnaghten; **Lord Shand**; Lord Davey	Appeal dismissed	Quebec Court of Queen's Bench (Appeal Side)
Simpson and others v. Molsons' Bank	[1895] UKPC 12	"The Honourable John Molson died on the 12th July 1860 leaving a will dated the 20th April of that year, and this appeal from a judgment of the Court of Queen's Bench of Lower Canada relates to 640 shares in The Molsons' Bank Canada which formed part of the residue of his estate."	Lord Herschell, Lord Chancellor; Lord Watson; Lord Hobhouse; Lord Macnaghten; **Lord Shand**; Lord Davey; Sir Richard Couch	Appeal dismissed	Quebec Court of Queen's Bench (Appeal Side)
Forget v. Ostigny	[1895] UKPC 16	"The Appellant is a member of the Montreal Stock Exchange. The action which has given rise to this appeal was brought to recover a sum of $1,926.87, the balance alleged to be due from the respondent in respect of certain contracts entered into by the Appellant on his behalf and by his directions for the purchase and sale of shares in various Joint Stock Companies."	**Lord Herschell, Lord Chancellor**; Lord Watson; Lord Hobhouse; Lord Macnaghten; Lord Shand; Lord Davey; Sir Richard Couch	Appeal allowed	Quebec Court of Queen's Bench (Appeal Side)
Ross v. W.C. Edwards and Company	[1895] UKPC 41	"The Respondents W.C. Edwards & Co. who are manufacturers of lumber carrying on business at Rockland in the Province of Ontario, sold to the firm of Hurteau et Frère about 4 million feet of deals stored in their yard at Rockland."	Lord Watson; Lord Hobhouse; **Lord Macnaghten**; Sir Richard Couch	Appeal dismissed	Court of Appeal for Ontario
La Banque d'Hochelaga v. Jodoin et al	[1895] UKPC 45	"The Plaintiffs, who are now Respondents, are the testamentary executors of Madame Marie Hélène Jodin, widow of Amable Jodoin fils. The suit is brought to recover from the Defendants, now Appellants, La Banque d'Hochelaga, 100 shares, of the par value of $100 a share in that Company, and also the dividends declared on the same share since December 1879."	Lord Watson; **Lord Hobhouse**; Lord Morris; Sir Richard Couch	Appeal allowed	Quebec Court of Queen's Bench (Appeal Side)
The Municipal Corporation of the City of Toronto v. Virgo	[1895] UKPC 48	"This is an appeal from a judgment of the Supreme Court of Canada, reversing by a majority the previous decisions of the Court of Appeal for Ontario, and of Chief Justice Sir Thomas Galt. The question for decision is whether a section of a by-law was competently and validly made by the Corporation of the City of Toronto."	Lord Watson; Lord Macnaghten; Lord Morris; **Lord Davey**; Sir Richard Couch	Appeal dismissed	Supreme Court of Canada
The Eastern Townships Bank v. Rough and others	[1895] UKPC 52	"Although the facts of this case are somewhat complicated, the questions of law involved do not in their Lordships' opinion present any difficulty. The Eastern Townships Bank carry on the business of bankers in Canada, having their head office at Sherbrooke in the Province of Quebec with a branch office at Coaticooke. Amongst the persons banking with the Eastern Townships Bank were the Pioneer Beetroot Sugar Company. In February 1882 this company was indebted to the Bank in a considerable amount. As security for $15,000 a part of this indebtedness, the Bank held mortgages of the real estate of the company. In respect of a further sum of $23,000 the Bank obtained a judgment by default against the company on the 25th February 1882 and registered it against the real property of the company on the same day."	**Lord Herschell**; Lord Watson; Lord Davey	Appeal dismissed	Quebec Court of Queen's Bench (Appeal Side)
Reynolds and another v. The Attorney General of Nova Scotia and others	[1896] UKPC 8	"This case comes by appeal from a judgment of the Supreme Court of Nova Scotia affirming a judgment of the Honourable Mr. Justice Meagher, by which it was decreed that the renewal of the 21st of August 1889 of the license to work dated the 23rd of August 1887 and granted to the Appellants by the Commissioner of Mines and Public Works for the province of Nova Scotia and which purported to be granted and issued under the provisions of Chapter VII. of the Revised Statutes of Nova Scotia Fifth Series was unauthorized by the said Act and was null and void and consequently that the said renewal license to work should be set aside and further decreed that the Respondent Hugh St. Quentin Cayley on the 14th April of 1890 became entitled to have granted to him by the said Commissioner under the provisions of the said Statute a lease of area described in his application and that he should on the granting of the same stand possessed thereof for the benefit of himself and the other realtors on whose behalf he made application for the said lease, and further decreed that the lease of the said area granted to the Appellants by the said Commissioner and dated the 18th February 1891 was unauthorised and null and void and that the Appellants should deliver up the same to be cancelled."	Lord Watson; **Lord Morris**; Lord Davey; Sir Richard Couch	Appeal dismissed	Supreme Court of Nova Scoti
Attorney-General for Ontario v. Attorney-General for the Dominion (Local Prohibition Case)	[1896] UKPC 20; [1896] AC 348 (PC)	"Their Lordships think it expedient to deal in the first instance, with the seventh question, because it raises a practical issue, to which the able arguments of Counsel on both sides of the Bar were chiefly directed, and also because it involves considerations which have a material bearing upon the answers to be given to the other six questions submitted in this appeal. In order to appreciate the merits of the controversy, it is necessary to refer to certain laws for the restriction of suppression of the liquor traffic which were passed by the legislature of the old province of Canada before the Union, or have since been enacted by the Parliament of the Dominion, and by the legislature of Ontario, respectively."	Lord Halsbury, Lord Chancellor; Lord Herschell; **Lord Watson**; Lord Davey; Sir Richard Couch	Appeal allowed	Supreme Court of Canada
Fielding and others v. Thomas	[1896] UKPC 33	"This is an appeal from an order of the Supreme Court of Nova Scotia Supreme Court dismissing the application of the Appellants for an order that the verdict and judgment entered for the present Respondent at the trial of the action before Townshend, J., might be set aside and judgment should be entered for the Appellants. By the verdict and judgment in question the Appellants were found to have unlawfully assaulted and imprisoned the Respondent. The Supreme Court were equally divided."	**Lord Halsbury, Lord Chancellor**; Lord Herschell; Lord Watson; Lord Macnaghten; Lord Morris; Lord Davey; Sir Richard Couch	Appeal allowed	Supreme Court of Nova Scotia
Esquimalt and Nanaimo Railway Company v. William Herbert Bainbridge	[1896] UKPC 35	"The Respondent in this Appeal is the holder of a free miner's certificate under the 'British Columbia Placer Mining Act 1891,' (54 Vict. cap. 26), authorizing him to work the 'Blue Ruin' claim, 100 by 100 feet, which is situate within lands in Vancouver Island belonging to the Appellant Company."	**Lord Watson**; Lord Hobhouse; Lord Davey; Sir Richard Couch	Appeal dismissed	British Columbia Supreme Court (Full Court)
John T. Ross and others v. The Queen	[1896] UKPC 40	"The Appellants in this case are the legal personal representatives of Mr. John Ross who acquired by assignment the rights and interest of a firm of railway contractors trading as J.B. Bertrand & Co. in certain Government contracts for the construction of two sections of the railway which connects the River St. Lawrence with the City of Halifax and is known as the Intercolonial Railway. Mr. Ross claimed from the government large sums of money as due to him in right of the contractors. Payment was refused and he then presented a petition of right to enforce his claim."	Lord Hobhouse; **Lord Macnaghten**; Lord Davey; Sir Richard Couch	Appeal dismissed	Supreme Court of Canada
The Toronto Railway Company v. The Queen	[1896] UKPC 43	"The question in this appeal is whether the Appellants are bound to pay duty on steel rails imported by them for the purposes of their business. They have paid under protest the sum demanded by the Crown, and they seek to recover it in the present action which was brought in the Exchequer Court of Canada."	**Lord Hobhouse**; Lord Macnaghten; Lord Davey; Sir Richard Couch	Appeal allowed	Supreme Court of Canada
Stewart v. Maclean (Smith mis-en-cause)	[1896] UKPC 44	"This appeal arises out of an action by one of three partners against another partner for recovery of a sum of money under the following circumstances. By Articles of Partnership dated 30th December 1886 MacLean (the present Respondent) Stewart (the present Appellant) and Smith (who was called as mis-en-cause) entered into a partnership for five years."	Lord Hobhouse; Lord Macnaghten; **Lord Davey**; Sir Richard Couch	Appeal allowed	Supreme Court of Canada
Edison General Electric Company v. The Westminster and Vancouver Tramway Company, the Bank of British Columbia, and others	[1896] UKPC 45	"The suit in this case was brought by the Appellants in the Supreme Court of British Columbia against the Respondents to have a judgment obtained by the Bank of British Columbia against the Westminster and Vancouver Tramway Company declared null and void and the executions issued thereon and the certificates thereof, registered as a charge against the lands of the Tramway Company, set aside and cancelled."	Lord Hobhouse; Lord Macnaghten; Lord Davey; **Sir Richard Couch**	Appeal allowed	British Columbia Supreme Court (Full Court)
Mary Elizabeth Allen and John Henry Allen v. Quebec Warehouse Company	[1896] UKPC 48	"This is an appeal by Mary Elizabeth Allen and John Henry Allen, her husband, Plaintiffs in an action brought by them against the Quebec Warehouse Company, to recover damages for an injury sustained by a ship belonging to the female Plaintiff in the month of November 1880."	Lord Fitzgerald; Lord Herschell; Sir Barnes Peacock	Appeal dismissed	Quebec Court of Queen's Bench (Appeal Side)
Senecal v. Hatton and another	[1896] UKPC 50	"This is an appeal from a judgment of the Court of Queen's Bench in Lower Canada which modified a judgment which had been given by the Superior Court."	Lord Hobhouse; Lord Herschell; Sir Barnes Peacock; Sir Richard Couch	Appeal dismissed	Quebec Court of Queen's Bench (Appeal Side)
The Attorney-General for the Dominion of Canada v. The Attorney-General for the Province of Ontario, and The Attorney-General for the Province of Quebec v. The Attorney-General for the Province of Ontario	[1896] UKPC 51	"In the year 1850, the Ojibeway Indians inhabiting the Lake Huron District, and the Indians of the same tribe inhabiting the Lake Superior District, entered into separate treaties with the Governor of the Province of Canada, acting on behalf of Her Majesty and the Government of the Province, for the cession of certain tracts of land, which had until that time been occupied as Indian reserves. As consideration for these surrenders, a sum of money was immediately paid under each treaty; and a promise and agreement were given by the Governor, as representing the Crown and the provincial Government, to pay a perpetual annuity, in one case of 600l., and in the other of 400l."	**Lord Watson**; Lord Hobhouse; Lord Morris; Sir Richard Couch	Appeal dismissed	Supreme Court of Canada
Owners of the "Thomas Allen" v. Gow and others	[1896] UKPC 55	"This is an appeal from a decision of the Judge of the Vice Admiralty Court, at Halifax, Nova Scotia, in an action for salvage, on the ground that the sum awarded by the learned Judge is excessive."	Lord Herschell; Sir Barnes Peacock; Sir James Hannen	Appeal allowed	Vice Admiralty Court, Nova Scotia
The Brewers and Maltsters Association of Ontario v. The Attorney General for Ontario	[1897] UKPC 2	"This is an appeal from a judgment of the Court of Appeal for the Province of Ontario upon certain questions referred by the Lieutenant Governor in Council pursuant to the provisions of the 53rd Victoria chapter 13."	**Lord Herschell**; Lord Watson; Lord Hobhouse; Lord Morris; Sir Richard Couch	Appeal dismissed	Court of Appeal for Ontario
F.D. Grey and another v. The Manitoba and North-Western Railway Company of Canada	[1897] UKPC 8	"The Appellants, who were Plaintiffs below, contend that they are entitled to a decree for sale of a section of the Defendants' line of railway and telegraph."	Lord Watson; **Lord Hobhouse**; Lord Macnaghten; Lord Morris; Lord Shand; Lord Davey	Appeal allowed in part	Manitoba Court of Queen's Bench
Arsène A. Larocque v. Hyacinthe Beauchemin and others	[1897] UKPC 16	"The Appellant is the liquidator of a Company called La Compagnie de papier de Sorel incorporated in 1886 under an Act of the Provincial Legislature of Quebec known as 'The Joint Stock Companies Incorporation Act'."	Lord Herschell; Lord Watson; **Lord Macnaghten**; Lord Morris; Lord Shand	Appeal dismissed	Quebec Superior Court
The London and Lancashire Life Assurance Company v. Jean Fleming	[1897] UKPC 41	"This is an appeal from a judgment of the Court of Appeal of the Province of Ontario affirming a judgment of the learned Chief Justice of the Common Pleas Division."	Lord Macnaghten; Lord Morris; Sir Richard Couch; **Sir Henry Strong, CJC**	Appeal dismissed	Court of Appeal for Ontario
The City of Montreal v. The Standard Light and Power Company	[1897] UKPC 42	"On the 10th of September 1896 about half-past two o'clock in the afternoon workmen in the employ of the Respondent Company or their contractors broke up the surface of St. Antoine Street in the City of Montreal and began to excavate the soil for the purpose of laying underground wires along the street." "In the course of the same afternoon the City Surveyor and the Police officials acting as was admitted under instructions from the Municipal Council of the City interfered by force and compelled the men employed to abandon their operations."	**Lord Macnaghten**; Lord Morris; Sir Richard Couch; Sir Henry Strong, CJC	Appeal dismissed	Quebec Court of Queen's Bench (Appeal Side)
The Attorney General for the Dominion of Canada v. The Attorney General for the Province of Ontario (Queen's Counsel)	[1897] UKPC 49	"On the 29th of March 1873, the Legislature of the Province of Ontario passed two Acts, entitled respectively, 'An Act respecting the appointment of Queen's Counsel,' and 'An Act to regulate the precedence of the bar of Ontario.' These statutes were consolidated, and their provisions re-enacted by Cap. 139 of the Revised Statutes of Ontario, passed on the 31st December 1877. The Act of 1877 makes regulations for the qualification of barristers-at-law, and their admission to practice at the bar in Her Majesty's Courts of Law and Equity in Ontario. It declares that it 'was and is lawful for the Lieutenant Governor, by letters patent under the Great Seal of the Province of Ontario, to appoint from among the members of the bar of Ontario, such person as he may deem right to be, during pleasure, provincial officers under the names of Her Majesty’s Counsel learned in the law, for the Province of Ontario.' It also enacts that the Lieutenant Governor, by letters patent under the Great Seal of Ontario, may grant to any member of the bar a patent of precedence in the Courts of Ontario. In virtue of the authority thus conferred upon him, the Lieutenant Governor has, from time to time, exercised the right of issuing letters patent, in Her Majesty's name, to members of the provincial bar."	Lord Halsbury, Lord Chancellor; **Lord Watson**; Lord Macnaghten; Lord Morris; Lord Davey; Sir Henry De Villiers; Sir Henry Strong, CJC	Appeal dismissed	Court of Appeal for Ontario
Molson's Bank v. Cooper and Smith	[1898] UKPC 9	"In this case their Lordships are of opinion that the Appeal ought to be dismissed with costs. Their Lordships think it is right that in the first instance it should be pointed out that this Appeal has not been argued on the question of res judicata. Their Lordships do not consider that it was open to the Appellants, here, to argue that question. No leave to appeal on that subject was, certainly, intended to be given, and their Lordships, in view of what took place on the Application for special leave to appeal, are of opinion that no such leave was given."	**Earl of Halsbury, Lord Chancellor**; Lord Herschell; Lord Macnaghten; Lord Morris; Sir Richard Couch	Appeal dismissed	Supreme Court of Canada
The Great North-West Central Railway Company and others v. Charlebois and others	[1898] UKPC 12	"This suit was instituted for the purpose of invalidating a contract purporting to be made on the 16th September 1889 between the Plaintiff Company and the Defendant Charlebois, and a judgment obtained upon it by him against the Company on the 25th September 1891."	**Lord Hobhouse**; Lord Macnaghten; Lord Morris; Sir Richard Couch; Sir Henry de Villiers	Appeal allowed	Supreme Court of Canada
Johnston and the Toronto Type Foundry Company, Limited v. The Consumers' Gas Company of Toronto	[1898] UKPC 17	"The Respondents the Consumers' Gas Company of the Toronto were incorporated in 1848 by an Act of the Parliament of the [Province of] Canada 11 Vict. cap. 14. The preamble of the Act stated that the great and increasing extent of the city of Toronto and the great demand for a cheap and effective mode of lighting the streets and places of the city as well as the houses shops and other buildings therein rendered it desirable that more than one Company should be established for the purpose of furnishing a further supply of gas for lighting the city."	Earl of Halsbury, Lord Chancellor; Lord Watson; **Lord Macnaghten**; Lord Morris; Sir Richard Couch	Appeal dismissed	Court of Appeal for Ontario
The Attorney General for the Dominion of Canada v. The Attorneys General for the Provinces of Ontario, Quebec and Nova Scotia	[1898] UKPC 29; [1898] UKPC 30; [1898] UKPC 31	"The Governor General of Canada by Order in Council referred to the Supreme Court of Canada for hearing and consideration various questions relating to the property, rights and legislative jurisdiction of the Dominion of Canada and the Provinces respectively in relation to rivers, lakes, harbours, fisheries, and other cognate subjects."	Earl of Halsbury, Lord Chancellor; **Lord Herschell**; Lord Watson; Lord Macnaghten; Lord Morris; Lord Shand; Lord Davey; Sir Henry de Villiers	Appeal allowed in part	Supreme Court of Canada
Moor and another v. Lamoureux and others, representatives of S. Peters, deceased	[1898] UKPC 39	"On the 2nd of May 1877 the present Appellants and Simon Peters (since deceased) entered into a contract of that date with the Quebec Harbour Commissioners for the execution by them of certain works and improvements at the mouth of the river St. Charles in the Harbour of Quebec. The contract price was a lump sum of $554,296.31 including a provisional sum of $25,000 to meet the expenses of any extra works. But that lump sum was founded on the bills of quantities and rates and prices set forth in the tender by the Contractors which was annexed to the contract and described as Specification B."	Lord Watson; Lord Hobhouse; **Lord Davey**; Sir Richard Couch	Appeal allowed in part	Quebec Court of Queen's Bench (Appeal Side)
Kerry and others v. England	[1898] UKPC 48	"The Defendants in this suit, now Appellants, carry on the business of wholesale druggists in Montreal. The Plaintiff now respondent is a physician in the same city. On the 8th or 9th February 1894 Mrs. England wife of the Plaintiff had an attack of influenza, and wanted to take bismuth for it. Dr. England thereupon applied to Messrs. Dart & Co. druggists in Montreal for two ounces of that material; and they sent him a packet purporting to contain subnitrate of bismuth. Mrs. England took some and immediately felt that there was something wrong. It turned out that she had taken tartar emetic or antimony. On the 19th February she died. Dart & Co. informed the Plaintiff that the stuff supplied by them to him was part of a larger quantity supplied to them by the Defendants as subnitrate of bismuth."	Lord Herschell; Lord Watson; **Lord Hobhouse**; Lord Davey; Sir Henry Strong, CJC	Appeal allowed	Quebec Court of Queen's Bench (Appeal Side)
Canada Sugar Refining Company, Limited v. The Queen	[1898] UKPC 50	"The action out of which this appeal arises was commenced by information of the Attorney-General of Canada against the Appellants in the Exchequer Court of Canada to recover a large sum for duties on raw sugar imported by the Appellants into Canada by the steamship Cynthiana. The decision of the Exchequer Court was in favour of the Appellants but their judgment was reversed by the Supreme Court Mr. Justice King and Mr. Justice Girouard dissenting."	Lord Watson; Lord Hobhouse; **Lord Davey**	Appeal dismissed	Supreme Court of Canada
Young and Another v. The Consumers Cordage Company	[1898] UKPC 64	"The action out of which this appeal arises was commenced by the receivers in the liquidation of a Company called the National Cordage Company who are the present Appellants against a Company called the Consumers Cordage Company Limited to recover the sum of $44,144.64 for hemp sold by the National Company to the Defendants."	Lord Watson; Lord Hobhouse; **Lord Davey**; Sir Henry Strong, CJC	Appeal allowed	Quebec Court of Queen's Bench (Appeal Side)
The Grand Trunk Railway Company v. Washington	[1899] UKPC 3	"This is an Appeal from the Supreme Court of Canada reversing a judgment of the Court of Appeal of the Province of Ontario." "The action was brought by the respondent against the Appellants to recover damages for injuries suffered by him resulting in the loss of his arm in January 1896 while in the discharge of his duties as a yardman in the Appellants' employ at Hamilton in Ontario."	Lord Macnaghten; Lord Morris; **Sir Henry Strong, CJC**	Appeal dismissed	Supreme Court of Canada
Le Séminaire de Québec v. La Corporation de Limoilou	[1899] UKPC 4	"This is an Appeal from a judgment of the Court of Queen's Bench of the Province of Quebec in an action brought by the Respondents to recover $161.82 the amount of municipal taxes assessed upon part of a property belonging to the Appellants known as the 'Farm of Maizerets' situate in the municipality of Limoilou. The Appellants set up as a defence that the property in question is exempted from taxation under the provisions of the Municipal Code of the Province of Quebec.	Lord Watson; Lord Hobhouse; Lord Davey; **Sir Henry Strong, CJC**	Appeal dismissed	Quebec Court of Queen's Bench (Appeal Side)
Canadian Pacific Railway Company v. The Corporation of the Parish of Notre Dame De Bonsecours	[1899] UKPC 22	"Part of the railway of the Appellant Company runs through the parish of Notre Dame De Bonsecour, in the district of Ottawa, and province of Quebec; and the respondents are the municipal authority of the parish, under the provisions of the Municipal Code of the Province of Quebec."	Earl of Halsbury, Lord Chancellor; **Lord Watson**; Lord Hobhouse; Lord Macnaghten; Lord Morris; Lord Shand; Lord Davey	Appeal dismissed	Quebec Court of Queen's Bench (Appeal Side)
The Corporation of the City of Victoria v. Patterson; The Corporation of the City of Victoria v. Lang	[1899] UKPC 30; [1899] UKPC 31	"These are two actions, one brought by Marion R. Patterson, the window, and the administratrix of the goods of one James T. Patterson, deceased, against the Corporation of the City of Victoria, by reason of an accident that happened on the 26th of May 1896; the second action is by Martha Maria Lang, the widow, and administratrix of the estate and effects of John Lang, deceased."	**Earl of Halsbury, Lord Chancellor**; Lord Watson; Lord Macnaghten; Lord Morris; Lord Davey	Appeal dismissed	British Columbia Supreme Court
Canadian Pacific Railway Company v. Henry F. Parke and Robert Pinchard	[1899] UKPC 34	"The Appellants are owners of the Dominion Railway, known as the Canadian Pacific Railway, which, in its course through the Yale District of British Columbia, passes near to the Thompson River, at the distance of about half a mile from the lands belonging to the respondents, which lie to the eastward."	Earl of Halsbury, Lord Chancellor; **Lord Watson**; Lord Hobhouse; Lord Macnaghten; Lord Morris; Lord Shand; Lord Davey	Appeal allowed	Supreme Court of British Columbia
Montreal Lithographic Company, Limited v. Sabiston	[1899] UKPC 41	"In the year 1889 a company was incorporated under Letters Patent of the Province of Quebec with the name of the "Sabiston Lithographic and Publishing Company." That Company carried on business at the Gazette Building Montreal until the 13th April 1896 when a winding-up order was made against it and a liquidator was appointed. One Alexander Sabiston was the managing director or manager of the Company until a short time before it went into liquidation."	Earl of Halsbury, Lord Chancellor; Lord Watson; Lord Macnaghten; Lord Morris; **Lord Davey**	Appeal dismissed	Quebec Court of Queen's Bench (Appeal Side)
Madden and another, and The Attorney General for British Columbia v. The Nelson and Fort Sheppard Railway Company	[1899] UKPC 47	"Their Lordships are of opinion that in this case the Judgment appealed from ought to be affirmed. The course of the argument has been rather to suggest that if there is no direct enactment in the Statute ('The Cattle Protection Act, 1891,' 54 Vict. c. 1. (B.C.) as amended by 'The Cattle Protection Act, 1895' 58 Vict. c. 7. (B.C.)) — the validity of which is in question – to create any erection or construction of the works of the railway that it would avoid the objection of the statute being ultra vires."	**Earl of Halsbury, Lord Chancellor**; Lord Watson; Lord Hobhouse; Lord Macnaghten; Sir Edward Fry; Sir Henry Strong, CJC	Appeal dismissed	Supreme Court of British Columbia
Demers v. The Bank of Montreal	[1899] UKPC 57	"This is an Appeal from a Judgment of the Court of Queen's Bench for the Province of Quebec, which affirmed a Judgment of the Superior Court of the District of Quebec. The effect of the Judgment of the Superior Court was to find the Appellant liable to pay to the Bank a sum of $5,689 24 cents. The Appellant Demers appeals from the Order of the Court of Queen's Bench, and he appeals on two grounds. First, he disputes his liability, and then he quarrels with the amount."	Lord Watson; **Lord Macnaghten**; Sir Henry Strong, CJC	Appeal dismissed	Quebec Court of Queen's Bench (Appeal Side)
Union Colliery Co. of British Columbia v. Bryden	[1899] UKPC 58	"The Appellant Company carries on the business of mining coal, by means of underground mines in lands belonging to the Company, situated near to the town of Union in British Columbia. The Company have hitherto employed, and still continue to employ, Chinamen in the working of these underground mines."	**Lord Watson**; Lord Hobhouse; Lord Macnaghten; Sir Richard Couch; Sir Edward Fry	Appeal allowed	Supreme Court of British Columbia
Montreal Gas Company v. Cadieux	[1899] UKPC 59	"The Appellants are a Company formed for the purpose of making and supplying gas in Montreal. They were incorporated in 1847 by a Statute of the Province of Canada (10 & 11 Vict. Chap. 79 (under the name of 'The New City Gas Company of Montreal'. Their name was changed in 1879 to 'The Montreal Gas Company' by a Statute of Quebec 41 Vict. Chap. 81." "The Respondent was a customer of the Montreal Gas Company. He had two sets of premises in Montreal, 1125, Notre Dame Street, and 282 St. Charles Borromée Street where he resided. He took gas from the Company for both. The question is whether he is entitled to require the Company to supply gas for the one set of premises while he neglects to pay his gas bill for the other."	Lord Watson; Lord Hobhouse; Lord Macnaghten; Sir Edward Fry; **Sir Henry Strong, CJC**	Appeal allowed	Supreme Court of Canada
Joseph Napoléon Anctil v. The Manufacturers' Life Insurance Company	[1899] UKPC 60	"This action was brought by the Appellant, Joseph Napoléon Anctil, against the Respondent Company, for recovery of the contents of a policy of Insurance issued by the Company on the 12th May 1894, on the life of one Antoine Pettigrew. The amount of the insurance, which was for $2,000, was by the policy made payable to the Appellant, his executors, administrators, and assigns, under deduction of the premium for the current year, upon its being proved, to the satisfaction of the office, that the death of the assured had taken place, whilst the policy was still current."	**Lord Watson**; Lord Macnaghten; Sir Henry Strong, CJC	Appeal dismissed	Supreme Court of Canada
The Queen v. Demers	[1899] UKPC 66	"In August 1897 the Respondent Demers carrying on business in the city of Quebec as a printer under the firm of J.L. Demers et Frère sued Her Majesty the Queen by a Petition of Right claiming $85,000 as damages for breach of a contract in respect of the printing and binding of certain public documents."	Earl of Halsbury, Lord Chancellor; Lord Watson; **Lord Macnaghten**; Lord Morris; Lord Davey; Sir Henry Strong, CJC	Appeal allowed	Quebec Court of Queen's Bench (Appeal Side)

== Summary by year and result ==
Year	Number of Cases	Appeal Allowed		Appeal Dismissed	
1890	2	1	50.0%	1	50.0%
1891	2	1	50.0%	1	50.0%
1892	10	5	50.0%	5	50.0%
1893	6	3	50.0%	3	50.0%
1894	6	2	33.3%	4	66.7%
1895	11	3	27.3%	8	72.7%
1896	12	6	50.0%	6	50.0%
1897	6	1	16.7%	5	83.3%
1898	8	5	62.5%	3	37.5%
1899	13	4	30.8%	9	69.2%
Total Cases	76	31	40.8%	45	59.2%
Yearly Averages	7.6	3.1		4.5	

== Summary by jurisdiction and court appealed from ==
Jurisdiction	Number of Cases	On Appeal from Supreme Court of Canada	On Appeal from Other Courts
Federal	6	6	0
Ontario	17	6	11
Quebec	32	5	27
Nova Scotia	6	0	6
New Brunswick	2	1	1
Manitoba	5	2	3
British Columbia	8	1	7
Prince Edward Island	0	0	0
North-West Territories	0	0	0
Yukon	0	0	0
Total	76	21	55

== See also ==
- List of Canadian appeals to the Judicial Committee of the Privy Council, 1867–1869
- List of Canadian appeals to the Judicial Committee of the Privy Council, 1870–1879
- List of Canadian appeals to the Judicial Committee of the Privy Council, 1880–1889
- List of Canadian appeals to the Judicial Committee of the Privy Council, 1900–1909
- List of Canadian appeals to the Judicial Committee of the Privy Council, 1910–1919
- List of Canadian appeals to the Judicial Committee of the Privy Council, 1920–1929
- List of Canadian appeals to the Judicial Committee of the Privy Council, 1930–1939
- List of Canadian appeals to the Judicial Committee of the Privy Council, 1940–1949
- List of Canadian appeals to the Judicial Committee of the Privy Council, 1950–1959

== Sources ==
- British and Irish Legal Information Institute: Privy Council Decisions
- 1890 Privy Council Decisions
- 1891 Privy Council Decisions
- 1892 Privy Council Decisions
- 1893 Privy Council Decisions
- 1894 Privy Council Decisions
- 1895 Privy Council Decisions
- 1896 Privy Council Decisions
- 1897 Privy Council Decisions
- 1898 Privy Council Decisions
- 1899 Privy Council Decisions
