= Marc Gold =

Canadian politician

The Honourable Marc Gold PC

Representative of the Government in the Senate
- In office January 24, 2020 – June 30, 2025
- Prime Minister: Justin Trudeau; Mark Carney
- Preceded by: Peter Harder
- Succeeded by: Pierre Moreau

Canadian Senator from Quebec (Stadacona)
- In office November 25, 2016 – June 30, 2025
- Nominated by: Justin Trudeau
- Appointed by: David Johnston
- Preceded by: Jean-Claude Rivest

Personal details
- Born: June 30, 1950 (age 76) Montreal, Quebec, Canada
- Party: Non-affiliated
- Other political affiliations: Independent Senators Group (2016 – 2020)
- Spouse: Nancy Cummings Gold
- Children: 2
- Parent: Alan B. Gold (father)
- Relatives: Nora Gold (sister)
- Education: McGill University; University of British Columbia; Harvard Law School
- Profession: Lawyer; professor; businessman

Marc Gold PC (born June 30, 1950) is a Canadian law professor and politician who served as Representative of the Government in the Senate from 2020 until his retirement in 2025. Gold sat as the senator for Stadacona, Quebec since his appointment on the advice of Prime Minister Justin Trudeau in 2016. He was a member of the Independent Senators Group (ISG) caucus from 2016 to 2020 but then sat as an independent. Prior to his appointment as a senator, Gold taught law and was appointed associate dean at Osgoode Hall Law School.

== Early life and education ==
Gold is the son of Alan B. Gold, who was chief justice of Quebec Superior Court. Gold is Jewish.

He earned his undergraduate degree at McGill University in 1972, and an LL.B from the University of British Columbia in 1978 with top honours as the gold medalist. Recipient of the Viscount Bennett Scholarship by the Canadian Bar Association, he received his LL.M from the Harvard Law School in 1979. Gold is a member of the Barreau du Québec and of the Law Society of Ontario, and has completed mediation training at the Harvard Law School Program on Negotiation.

== Career ==
Gold was previously a law professor at Osgoode Hall Law School in Toronto for 12 years, ultimately serving as associate dean, and also provided training for federally-appointed judges in the area of constitutional law and the Canadian Charter of Rights and Freedoms. More recently, he has been adjunct professor of law at McGill University.

He has been involved in Jewish community life as chair of the Jewish Federations of Canada, a member of the Board of Governors of the Jewish Agency for Israel, and is a former chairperson of the Canada-Israel Committee. He served for ten years as the chair of ENSEMBLE pour le respect de la diversité (formerly the Tolerance Foundation), a not-for-profit organization that works with youth to build a more open and inclusive society. At the time of his appointment to the Senate he was a part-time member of the Parole Board of Canada.

In the early 1990s he returned to Montreal to become vice-president of Maxwell Cummings and Sons, a family-owned private real estate and investment firm based in Montreal, a position he held for 23 years.

Gold accepted a position, effective after his retirement from the senate, as visiting fellow at the Institute for the Study of Canada at McGill University and in 2026 is to teach a course entitled “Policy, Politics and the Legislative Process in Canada: A view from the inside,” exploring the interaction of policy, politics and the legislative process.

== Political career ==
Gold's appointment was announced on November 2, 2016, by Prime Minister Justin Trudeau. He assumed office on November 25, 2016, and was sworn as a Senator on December 2, 2016.

He was named Representative of the Government in the Senate on January 24, 2020.

Prime Minister Mark Carney announced him as the lead of the Ministerial Advisory Council on Rights, Equality and Inclusion on June 1, 2026.
