= Nora Gold =

Canadian author

- Born: Montreal, Quebec, Canada 1952 (age 73-74)
- Education: McGill University; University of Toronto
- Occupations: writer; former associate professor; activist
- Spouse: David Solomon Weiss
- Children: Joseph Weissgold
- Parent(s): Alan B. Gold (father), Lynn Lubin Gold (mother)
- Relatives: Marc Gold (brother), Daniel Gold (brother)
- Writing career
- Language: English
- Genre: Contemporary literature
- Notable works: Marrow And Other Stories; Fields of Exile; The Dead Man; 18: Jewish Stories Translated From 18 Languages; In Sickness and In Health/Yom Kippur in a Gym
- Notable awards: Canadian Jewish Book Award; Canadian Jewish Literary Award
- Website: www.noragold.com

Nora Gold (born 1952) is a Canadian author and the founder and editor of Jewish Fiction .net. Previously, she was an associate professor of social work.

== Early life and education ==
Gold grew up in Montreal, Quebec, the daughter of the late Alan B. Gold, former chief justice of the Superior Court of Quebec, and Lynn Lubin Gold, a teacher of English literature at Dawson College. Gold holds a bachelor of social work from McGill University and a master's degree and doctorate in social work from the University of Toronto. She received seven funded research grants, including two from the Social Science and Humanities Research Council of Canada and two from the Halbert Centre for Canadian Studies for international Canada-Israel collaborations.

== Career ==
=== Literary ===
Gold's first book, Marrow and Other Stories, was released in 1998 by Warwick Publishing. It received a Canadian Jewish Book Award, was shortlisted for the Danuta Gleed Literary Award and was praised by Alice Munro. In 2014, Dundurn Press released Gold's first novel, Fields of Exile, which dealt with the subjects of anti-Zionism and anti-Semitism. It won the 2015 Canadian Jewish Literary Award for Best Novel and was praised by Cynthia Ozick and Phyllis Chesler. Two notable reviews of Fields of Exile were written by Ruth Wisse in Mosaic Magazine and by Goldie Morgentaler in Nashim: A Journal of Jewish Women's Studies & Gender Issues.

Gold's second novel and third book, The Dead Man, was published in 2016 through Inanna Publications. It received international notice and a translation grant from the Canada Council for the Arts, which resulted in the 2019 release of The Dead Man published as Ha’ish Hamet in Hebrew. The book was launched on August 14, 2019, at the Official Residence in Tel Aviv of Deborah Lyons, the Canadian ambassador to Israel.

In October 2023 Gold’s fourth book was published. She is the editor of 18: Jewish Stories Translated From 18 Languages, which was praised by Cynthia Ozick, Dara Horn, and Alberto Manguel, among others. Her most recent book, In Sickness and In Health/Yom Kippur in a Gym (2 novellas) was published on March 1, 2024, and received glowing reviews.

Gold is the founding editor-in-chief of Jewish Fiction .net, an online journal that publishes international Jewish fiction, either written in English or translated into English from different languages.

Gold was also the founder and coordinator of the Wonderful Women Writers Series at the Toronto Public Library (Deer Park branch).

=== Social activism ===
Gold is a community activist focused primarily, though not exclusively, on organizations working in support of a progressive, socially just Israel. Gold co-founded the New Israel Fund of Canada (NIFC) in 1982, an international organization committed to furthering pluralism, civil rights, democracy, and social equality in Israel. In 1996, Gold co-founded Canadian Friends of Givat Haviva, a charity that promotes tolerance and mutual understanding between Jewish and Arab youth in Israel. Gold also founded JSpaceCanada in 2011, to provide Canadians with an alternative to both the extreme pro-Israel right and the extreme anti-Israel left. Gold has been formally recognized by the Toronto Jewish Community as an Outstanding Volunteer.

=== Academic ===
From 1990-2000, Gold was a tenured associate professor of social work at McMaster University. Gold left full-time academia in 2000 to focus more time on her literary career. From 2000-2018 (the year it closed) Gold was affiliated with the OISE/University of Toronto Centre for Women's Studies in Education, first as an associate scholar and then as its writer-in-residence. Currently, Gold is a member of the Academic Advisory Committee of the Hadassah Brandeis Institute.

== Personal life ==
Gold is married to David Solomon Weiss, younger brother of the rabbi Avi Weiss, and together they have a son, Joseph Weissgold. The couple are not Orthodox but consider themselves traditional and egalitarian. They divide their time between Toronto and Jerusalem.

== Bibliography ==
- Marrow And Other Stories (1998)
- Fields of Exile (2014)
- The Dead Man: A Novel (2016)
- In Sickness and In Health / Yom Kippur in a Gym (2024)
- Doubles (2026)
