= Lawrence Poitras =

Canadian judge (1931–2022)

The Honourable Lawrence A. Poitras QC CM

Chief Justice Quebec Superior Court
- In office 1992–1996
- Preceded by: Alan B. Gold
- Succeeded by: Lyse Lemieux

Chair of the Poitras Commission
- In office 1996–1999

Personal details
- Born: April 3, 1931
- Died: April 9, 2022 (aged 91)
- Spouse: Thérèse Boivin Poitras
- Children: 3
- Education: McGill University (BA); Université de Montréal (LLL)

Lawrence A. Poitras QC CM (April 3, 1931 – April 9, 2022) was a judge in the Canadian province of Quebec. He was best known for serving on an inquiry into the wrongful conviction of Donald Marshall and overseeing a high-profile public inquiry into the Sûreté du Québec (SQ).

== Biography ==
Poitras earned a Bachelor of Arts degree from McGill University in 1953 and a law degree from the Université de Montréal. He worked as a journalist with the Montreal Star before training as a barrister. He started a private law practice in 1957 and was named as a Queen's Counsel in 1973. Poitras was appointed a justice of the Quebec Superior Court in 1975, became associate chief justice in 1983, and was promoted to chief justice in 1992. He left the bench in 1996 and joined Borden Ladner Gervais LLP, from which he retired in 2007.

In 1986, he was appointed to serve on a three-person commission of inquiry examining the wrongful conviction of Donald Marshall, a member of Nova Scotia's Mi'kmaq community who served eleven years in prison for a murder he did not commit. The commission's seven-volume report, released in 1990, described Nova Scotia's justice system as plagued by racism, unprofessionalism, and unfairness. The commissioners concluded that Marshall was "convicted and sent to prison, in part at least, because he was a native person," recommended an independent review process to investigate alleged cases of wrongful conviction, and called for more members of visible minority communities to be appointed to the bench and hired for correctional services.

In late 1995, he appointed a single judge to oversee all aspects of former Canadian prime minister Brian Mulroney's libel suit against the Canadian Department of Justice and Royal Canadian Mounted Police (RCMP) regarding statements made by RCMP officials about Mulroney's dealings with businessman Karlheinz Schreiber.

The Government of Quebec appointed Poitras to lead a public inquiry into the Sûreté du Québec (SQ) in October 1996, following accusations of corruption and evidence tampering within the force. Poitras was given discretion as to the inquiry's parameters and indicated that it would not be limited by a time frame. The 2,700-page report, issued in 1999, accused the force of abusing its powers of arrest, being more concerned with protecting its image than investigating misconduct, and having an "unhealthy air of solidarity, expressed through the law of silence and retaliations" against dissident officers.

He later prepared a report on municipal de-mergers in the buildup to the 2003 Quebec municipal elections. He concluded that de-mergers could save money. In 2005, he served as an election monitor in the Mohawk community of the Kanesatake.

In 2003, he was named as a Member of the Order of Canada.

He was married to Thérèse Boivin Poitras and had three children, Thomas, Anne-Marie, and Marie-Claire.

He died on April 9, 2022, at the age of 91.
