= Deschênes Commission =

1985–1986 Canadian commission of inquiry

Commission of Inquiry on War Criminals in Canada
- Also known as: Deschênes Commission
- Commissioner: Jules Deschênes
- Inquiry period: February 7, 1985 – December 30, 1986
- Authorized: Order in Council P.C. 1985-348

The Deschênes Commission, officially known as the Commission of Inquiry on War Criminals in Canada, was established by the government of Canada in February 1985 to investigate claims that Canada had become a haven for Nazi war criminals. Headed by retired Superior Court of Quebec judge Jules Deschênes, the commission delivered its report in April 1987, after almost two years of hearings.

== Background ==
In December 1984, Sol Littman, the Canadian representative of the Simon Wiesenthal Center, wrote a letter to the Canadian government that he had obtained evidence that Josef Mengele had applied for a landed immigrant visa to Canada in 1962 under the name of Joseph Menke. Not receiving a response, Littman then had the story published in both the Toronto Star and The New York Times. The impact was immediate and the story was picked up by news outlets across the country.

On January 23, 1985, in the House of Commons of Canada, MP Robert Kaplan raised the issue of Mengele residing in Canada to the then Prime Minister Brian Mulroney. In response, Mulroney ordered the justice minister and Solicitor General to initiate an investigation into the validity of the accusations. On February 7, 1985, Justice Minister John Crosbie announced that Deschênes would head an independent Commission of Inquiry, with the task of investigating the charge that Nazi war criminals gained admittance to Canada by illegal or fraudulent means.

== Commission ==
The terms of reference for the commission were:

"To conduct such investigations regarding alleged war criminals in Canada, including whether any such persons are now resident in Canada and when and how they obtained entry to Canada, as in the opinion of the Commissioner are necessary in order to enable him to report to the Governor in Council his recommendations and advice relating to what further action might be taken in Canada to bring to justice such alleged war criminals who might be residing within Canada, including recommendations as to what legal means are now available to bring to justice any such persons in Canada, or whether and what legislation might be adopted by the Parliament of Canada to ensure that war criminals are brought to justice and made to answer for their crimes."

The commission was given wide powers to collect evidence, and required to report its findings and recommendations by December 31, 1985, but was granted several extensions during its investigation. The final report, dated December 30, 1986, was then tabled in the House of Commons on March 12, 1987.

The creation of the commission and allegations had raised tensions and placed the Jewish community against the Ukrainian and other eastern European and Baltic communities. The Ukrainian and other communities were represented by the Civil Liberties Commission (CLC), which later became the Ukrainian Canadian Civil Liberties Association. The CLC was created in February 1985 by the Ukrainian Canadian Committee and several other eastern European and Baltic community organizations for the purpose of lobbying and interacting with the Deschênes Commission. It was chaired by Toronto lawyer John B. Gregorovich. The stated goals of the CLC were the following:

1. To take a public stand against the defamation against Ukrainians.

2. Represent the Ukrainian and eastern European communities at the Deschênes commission.

3. To show that membership in the Ukrainian Insurgent Army, Organization of Ukrainian Nationalists and the Ukrainian 1st division is not proof of participation in war crimes.

4. To prevent the use of Soviet evidence in the commission and Canadian courts.

5. Require that any Canadian accused of war crimes must be tried in a criminal court (stricter proof requirements).

6. To extend the scope of the Deschênes commission to include all criminals who performed crimes against humanity.

The Jewish community was represented by the Canadian Jewish Congress and B'nai Brith, with Sol Littman as spokesman.

== Final report ==
The commission's final report was issued in April 1987 in two parts. The first part concluded that alleged Nazi war criminals had immigrated to Canada and in some cases were still residing in the country. The commission took selective approach to its mandate, investigating only allegations of Nazi war crimes (which were well-defined) and crimes against humanity (which at the time was a relatively new concept that concerned crimes that were not previously considered war crimes). The commission recommended changes to criminal and citizenship law to allow Canada to prosecute war criminals. In June 1987, the House of Commons passed legislation that allowed for the prosecution of foreign war crimes in Canadian courts and the deportation of naturalized war criminals. The second part of the final report, which concerned allegations against specific individuals, remains confidential and has never been made public.

As to the charge that Mengele had entered Canada, based on "the weight of the available evidence", the commission concluded "beyond a reasonable doubt" that he had not, and further concluded "without the slightest hesitation" that he did not attempt to enter the country in 1962 as alleged.

== Trials ==
Canadian prosecutors pressed charges against at least four men on allegations of participation in Holocaust war crimes. One case ended in acquittal; two cases were dropped when prosecutors had trouble obtaining overseas evidence; the fourth case was stayed due to the health of the defendant. Since 1998, courts have found that six men misrepresented their wartime activities and could have their citizenship revoked; this was not done because the evidence was circumstantial and insufficient. Another seven people subject to deportation or denaturalization procedures have died.

== Criticism and aftermath ==
Some individuals have criticized the commission for either exceeding its mandate or being overly influenced by foreign governments. By contrast, others argued that collaborators who had found refuge there. Historian Irving Abella stated to Mike Wallace of 60 Minutes that it was relatively easy for former SS members to enter Canada, as their distinctive tattoos meant they were reliably anti-communist. Bernie Farber, then the director of the Canadian Jewish Congress, stated that Nazis in Canada, of which there were estimated to be 3,000, was the country's "dirty little secret". In the late 1990s, the issue of war criminals living in Canada and the Canadian government's lack of interest in searching for and prosecuting these individuals was the subject of investigative reporting by NBC, CBS, the CBC, Global Television, and The New York Times.

Olga Bertelsen published an article critical of the commission, claiming that the Soviets framed an innocent man, Ivan Demjanjuk, as part of a larger attempt (referred to as Operation "Payback" or "Retribution") by the KGB to sow discord between Canadian Jews and Ukrainians, a position that is shared by Lubomyr Luciuk, a professor at the Royal Military College of Canada who published the actual 1985 KGB document that proved this was indeed done. Luciuk was also critical of the commission's selective mandate, citing how the Commission itself had concluded that allegations about there being "thousands" of "Nazi war criminals" in Canada had been "grossly exaggerated". Those claims have been dismissed by the Simon Wiesenthal Center, and Holocaust history professors, such as Efraim Zuroff and Per Anders Rudling. Demjanjuk himself was not found guilty in Israel or the United States, and died behind bars in Germany, while his appeal was being heard.

While the commission's final report stated that the numbers were "grossly exaggerated," the report admitted that it had not investigated materials kept either in the Soviet Union or Eastern Bloc countries, and that it further had not investigated an addendum list of 109 names provided late in the inquiry. The commission's decision to find the 14th Waffen Grenadier Division of the SS (1st Galician) not guilty of collective war crimes was controversial in some circles.

On November 4, 2024 the Library and Archives Canada (LAC) told in a letter sent to all organisation, that have requested to publish full report according to Access to Information Act, that "decision has been made to withhold the Part II Report of the Deschênes Commission in its entirety". Scholars and Jewish organizations criticized, that they had not been invited to the consulting meetings. At the end of November 2024, historians Per Anders Rudling and Jared McBride called for the full publication of the Dêschenes Commission report and the release of all documents relating to war criminals, following the example of the United States.

== See also ==
- Ratlines (World War II)
- Yaroslav Hunka scandal
- Repatriation of Cossacks after World War II
