= Fassett, Quebec =

Fassett
- Municipality
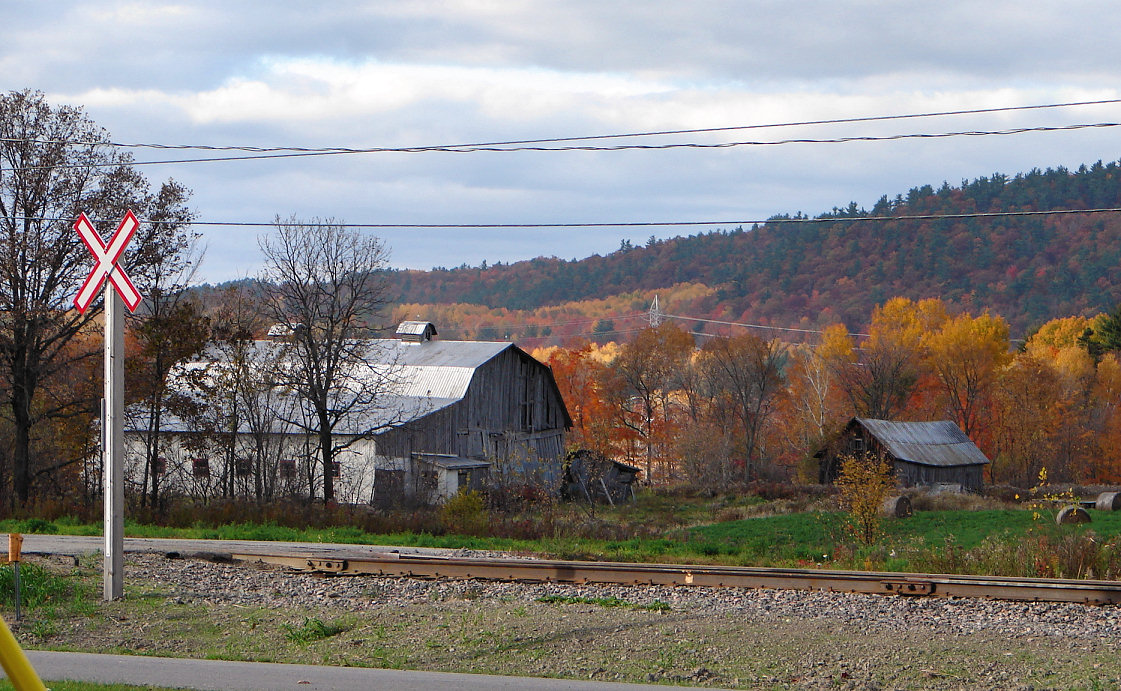

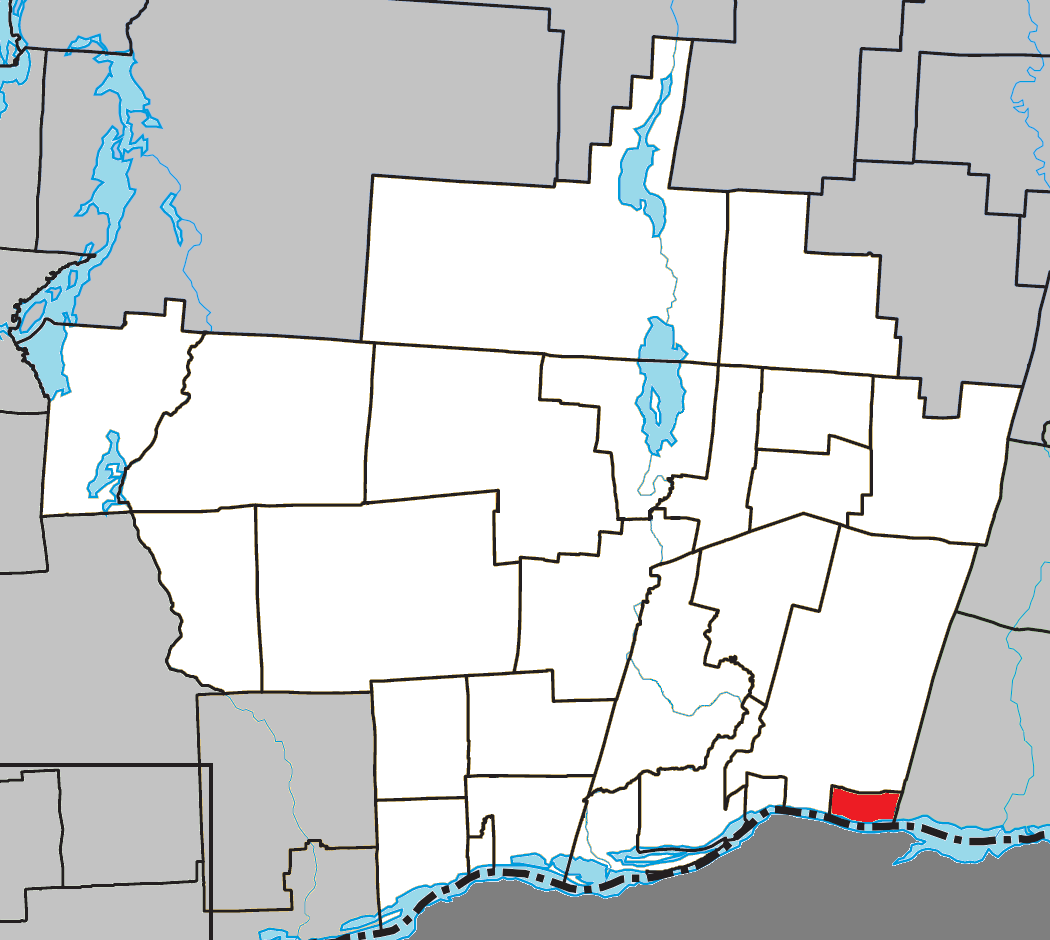
- Location within Papineau RCM

- Location in western Quebec
- Coordinates: 45°39′N 74°52′W
- Country: Canada
- Province: Quebec
- Region: Outaouais
- RCM: Papineau
- Settled: 1815
- Constituted: July 1, 1855

Government
  - Mayor: François Clermont
  - Federal riding: Argenteuil—La Petite-Nation
  - Prov. riding: Papineau

Area
  - Total: 15.50 km^{2} (5.98 sq mi)
  - Land: 12.52 km^{2} (4.83 sq mi)

Population (2021)
  - Total: 453
  - Density: 36.2/km^{2} (94/sq mi)
  - Pop 2016-2021: ▲5.1%
  - Dwellings: 280
- Time zone: UTC−5 (EST)
  - Summer (DST): UTC−4 (EDT)
- Postal code(s): J0V 1H0
- Area code: 819
- Highways A-50: R-148
- Website: www.village-fassett.com

Fassett is a municipality and village in the Papineau Regional County Municipality in Quebec, Canada, located on the north shore of the Ottawa River east of Montebello.

Its main access roads are Route 148, which passes through the town, and Autoroute 50 which passes to the north.

== History ==
The area was part of the Petite-Nation Seigneury, formed in 1674 and originally owned by François de Laval, the first bishop of New France. The seigneury was acquired in 1803 by Joseph Papineau, who became its first civilian seigneur, and who later sold it to his son Louis-Joseph Papineau.

The area became of interest economically when England was forced to rely on its colonies for wood for construction of its vessels during the Napoleonic blockade of 1807. It was full of oaks, pines, and maples regarding which Surveyor Joseph Bouchette wrote in 1815: "the terrain rises and is covered with wood of the best species: oaks are of high quality and particularly of large size, suitable for the construction of vessels."

In 1815, the original mission of Notre Dame de Bonsecours was created. In 1821 a chapel dedicated to Notre-Dame de Bonsecours (Our Lady of Good Help) was constructed. On September 30, 1831, the bishop of Quebec Bernard-Claude Panet granted a petition signed by Denis-Benjamin Papineau and over 75 tenants for the formation of a parish. His decree called the new parish Notre-Dame-de-Bonsecours-de-la-Petite-Nation and also recommended the people of Bonsecours to acquire civil recognition from the Governor General of Canada, Lord Aylmer.

On June 18, 1845, the Governor General of the Province of Canada, Charles Metcalfe, established local and municipal authorities in Lower Canada, under a new law passed by the provincial Parliament. One of the new municipalities created was the Municipality of Petite-Nation, which included the Parish of Notre-Dame-de-Bonsecours-de-la-Petite-Nation. However, this municipality was abolished in 1847.

On July 1, 1855, a new statute of the Province of Canada came into force, which allowed the parish to get official civilian recognition, known as Parish Municipality of Notre-Dame-de-Bon-Secours-de-la-Petite-Nation.

On August 22, 1878, Montebello separated from the parish municipality.

In the 1870s, the Quebec, Montreal, Ottawa and Occidental Railway was built, connecting Montreal to Ottawa. The rail-line went through the municipality of Notre-Dame, in what is now Fassett. The Canadian Pacific Railway bought the line in 1882.

In the late 1890s, there was a dispute between the municipality of Notre-Dame-de-Bonsecours and the Canadian Pacific Railway, which resulted in a court case that went all the way to the Judicial Committee of the Privy Council in Britain, the highest court of appeal for the British Empire. A ditch beside the rail-line had become clogged, resulting in flooding on the neighbouring land, owned by Julien Gervais. The municipality issued an order to the CPR, directing it to clean the obstruction. The CPR refused, arguing that as a federally incorporated railway, it was not required to comply with provincial law. The Quebec courts held that the provincial law did apply, and the CPR appealed to the Judicial Committee. In 1899, the Judicial Committee ruled in favour of the municipality and upheld the order to clean the ditch, in the case known as Canadian Pacific Railway Co. v Notre Dame de Bonsecours. The decision of the Judicial Committee continues to be cited with approval by the Supreme Court of Canada.

In the early 20th century, the Canadian Pacific Railway built a small station here. In 1906, the Thomas family opened a post office in the community. Both were named Fassett in honour of Jacob Sloat Fassett, the president of the Haskell Lumber Company (renamed Fassett Lumber Company in 1910) from 1904 until his death in 1924. Fassett was a lawyer and congressman from Elmira, New York who spent summers in a large beach estate he had built in Falmouth, Massachusetts on what is today known as Fassett's Point at the end of Little Island Road.

In 1913, the parish of Saint-Fidèle de Fassett was formed out of the Notre-Dame-de-Bonsecours Parish, and in 1918, the municipality split along these parish boundaries. The large rural and forested area became the Parish Municipality of Notre-Dame-de-Bon-Secours-Partie-Nord (which became the Municipality of Notre-Dame-de-Bonsecours in 2003). In 1951, the Parish Municipality of Notre-Dame-de-Bon-Secours became the Municipality of Fassett, named after the Fassett Lumber Company.

== Geography ==
=== Climate ===
Climate data for Fassett (1981−2010 normals, extremes 1962–2009)
Month	Jan	Feb	Mar	Apr	May	Jun	Jul	Aug	Sep	Oct	Nov	Dec	Year
Record high °C (°F)	12.0 (53.6)	13.3 (55.9)	20.5 (68.9)	30.0 (86.0)	32.8 (91.0)	34.4 (93.9)	36.0 (96.8)	36.1 (97.0)	34.5 (94.1)	27.5 (81.5)	19.0 (66.2)	14.0 (57.2)	36.1 (97.0)
Mean daily maximum °C (°F)	−6.1 (21.0)	−3.2 (26.2)	−2.2 (28.0)	11.3 (52.3)	18.7 (65.7)	23.8 (74.8)	26.3 (79.3)	25.1 (77.2)	20.2 (68.4)	12.5 (54.5)	5.1 (41.2)	−1.9 (28.6)	11.2 (52.2)
Daily mean °C (°F)	−11.2 (11.8)	−8.6 (16.5)	−2.9 (26.8)	6.0 (42.8)	12.9 (55.2)	18.1 (64.6)	20.6 (69.1)	19.6 (67.3)	15.0 (59.0)	8.0 (46.4)	1.4 (34.5)	−6.1 (21.0)	6.1 (43.0)
Mean daily minimum °C (°F)	−16.3 (2.7)	−13.9 (7.0)	−8.1 (17.4)	0.6 (33.1)	7.0 (44.6)	12.4 (54.3)	15.0 (59.0)	14.0 (57.2)	9.7 (49.5)	3.4 (38.1)	−2.4 (27.7)	−10.2 (13.6)	0.9 (33.6)
Record low °C (°F)	−38.0 (−36.4)	−33.9 (−29.0)	−33.0 (−27.4)	−15.0 (5.0)	−7.2 (19.0)	0.5 (32.9)	4.0 (39.2)	1.0 (33.8)	−2.5 (27.5)	−8.5 (16.7)	−19.0 (−2.2)	−34.0 (−29.2)	−38.0 (−36.4)
Average precipitation mm (inches)	64.9 (2.56)	59.8 (2.35)	60.6 (2.39)	74.3 (2.93)	80.1 (3.15)	103.1 (4.06)	94.9 (3.74)	94.4 (3.72)	101.9 (4.01)	97.2 (3.83)	98.2 (3.87)	79.5 (3.13)	1,008.9 (39.72)
Average rainfall mm (inches)	27.7 (1.09)	25.5 (1.00)	33.8 (1.33)	68.9 (2.71)	80.1 (3.15)	103.1 (4.06)	94.9 (3.74)	94.4 (3.72)	101.9 (4.01)	97.1 (3.82)	86.7 (3.41)	35.5 (1.40)	849.7 (33.45)
Average snowfall cm (inches)	37.4 (14.7)	34.3 (13.5)	26.7 (10.5)	5.4 (2.1)	0.0 (0.0)	0.0 (0.0)	0.0 (0.0)	0.0 (0.0)	0.0 (0.0)	0.1 (0.0)	11.6 (4.6)	44.0 (17.3)	159.4 (62.8)
Average precipitation days (≥ 0.2 mm)	14	12	11	12	13	13	13	12	12	14	14	16	154
Average rainy days (≥ 0.2 mm)	3	3	5	11	13	13	13	12	12	14	11	5	115
Average snowy days (≥ 0.2 cm)	12	9	6	1	0	0	0	0	0	0	4	11	43

== Demographics ==
Canada census – Fassett community profile

	2021	2016	2011
Population	453 (+5.1% from 2016)	431 (-4.4% from 2011)	451 (-3.6% from 2006)
Land area	12.52 km^{2} (4.83 sq mi)	12.49 km^{2} (4.82 sq mi)	12.30 km^{2} (4.75 sq mi)
Population density	36.2/km^{2} (94/sq mi)	34.5/km^{2} (89/sq mi)	36.7/km^{2} (95/sq mi)
Median age	58.8 (M: 59.6, F: 58.4)	56.9 (M: 56.3, F: 57.8)	53.9 (M: 52.5, F: 55.3)
Private dwellings	280 (total) 237 (occupied)	281 (total)	275 (total)
Median household income	$52,400	$42,432	$41,646

References: 2021 2016 2011

Historical census populations – Fassett, Quebec
Year	Pop.	±%
1861	2,451	—
1871	1,253	−48.9%
1881	847	−32.4%
1891	792	−6.5%
1901	917	+15.8%
1911	1,658	+80.8%
1921	1,048	−36.8%
1931	776	−26.0%
1941	650	−16.2%
1951	606	−6.8%
1956	609	+0.5%
1961	578	−5.1%
1966	545	−5.7%
1971	601	+10.3%
1976	514	−14.5%
1981	516	+0.4%
1986	471	−8.7%
1991	505	+7.2%
1996	500	−1.0%
2001	483	−3.4%
2006	468	−3.1%
2011	451	−3.6%
2016	431	−4.4%
2021	453	+5.1%
Source: Statistics Canada

Mother tongue:

- English as first language: 1.1%
- French as first language: 93.3%
- English and French as first language: 2.2%
- Other as first language: 2.2%
