= Notre-Dame-de-Bonsecours =

- Municipality
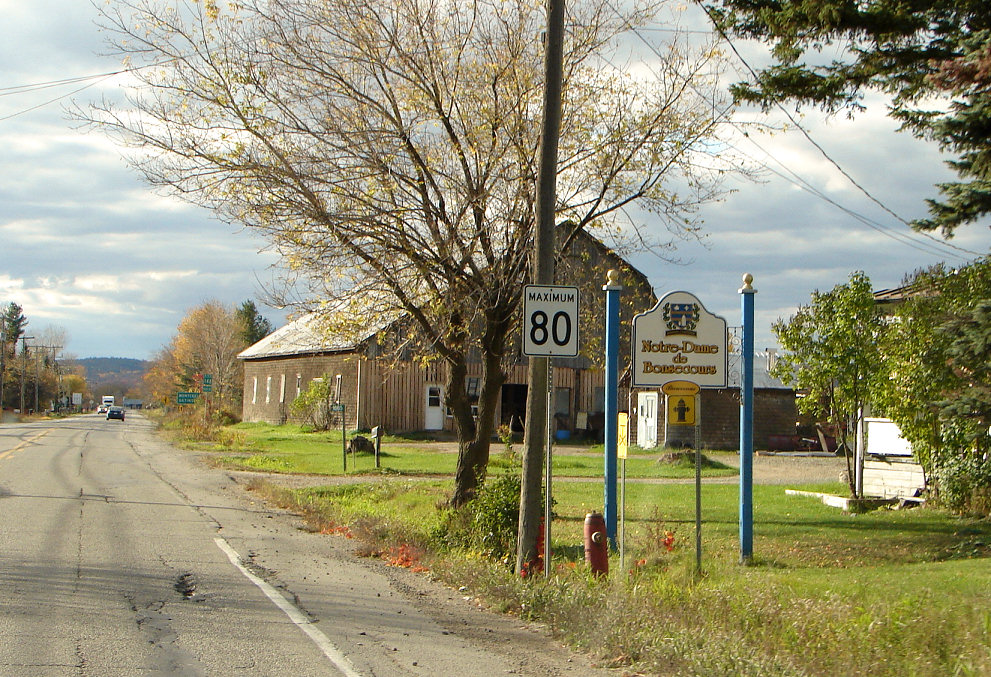
- Village entrance
- Motto: Seigneurs et Bâtisseurs
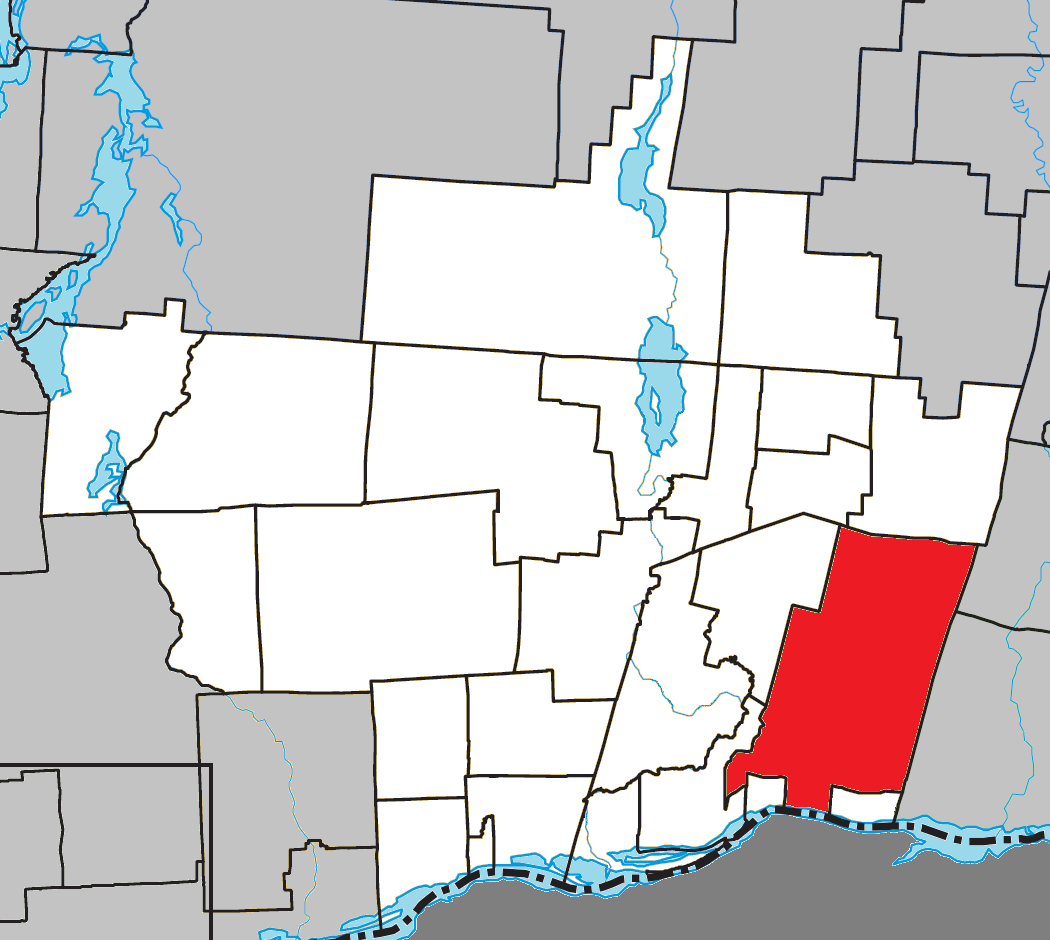
- Location within Papineau RCM

- Location in western Quebec
- Coordinates: 45°42′N 74°52′W
- Country: Canada
- Province: Quebec
- Region: Outaouais
- RCM: Papineau
- Constituted: March 7, 1918

Government
  - Mayor: Chantale Lauzon
  - Federal riding: Argenteuil—La Petite-Nation
  - Prov. riding: Papineau

Area
  - Total: 281.30 km^{2} (108.61 sq mi)
  - Land: 258.36 km^{2} (99.75 sq mi)

Population (2021)
  - Total: 285
  - Density: 1.1/km^{2} (2.8/sq mi)
  - Pop 2016-2021: ▼5.3%
  - Dwellings: 166
- Time zone: UTC−5 (EST)
  - Summer (DST): UTC−4 (EDT)
- Postal code(s): J0V 1L0
- Area code: 819
- Highways A-50: R-148; R-323
- Website: www.ndbonsecours.com

Notre-Dame-de-Bonsecours (French pronunciation: [nɔtʁə dam də bɔ̃səkuʁ]) is a municipality in the Outaouais region of Quebec, Canada. It is located along the Ottawa River, about 55 kilometres (34 mi) east of Gatineau. It was formerly known as Notre-Dame-de-Bon-Secours-Partie-Nord. It is the least populated municipality in the Papineau Regional County Municipality.

The northern portion of the municipality is undeveloped wilderness, mostly part of the Kenauk Reserve. This 260 square kilometres (100 sq mi) protected wilderness domain was formerly known as "Reserve de la Petite Nation", but is now a privately owned fish and game reserve of Château Montebello.

== History ==
The area was part of the Petite-Nation Seigneury, formed in 1674 and originally owned by François de Laval, the first bishop of New France. The seigneury was acquired in 1803 by Joseph Papineau, who became its first civilian seigneur, and later sold it to his son Louis-Joseph Papineau.

The area became of interest economically when England was forced to rely on its colonies for wood for construction of its vessels during the Napoleonic blockade of 1807. It was full of oaks, pines, and maples regarding which Surveyor Joseph Bouchet wrote in 1815: "the terrain rises and is covered with wood of the best species: oaks are of high quality and particularly of large size, suitable for the construction of vessels."

In 1815 the original mission of Notre Dame de Bonsecours was created and in 1821 a chapel dedicated to Notre-Dame de Bonsecours (Our Lady of Good Help) was constructed. On September 31, 1831, the bishop of Quebec Bernard-Claude Panet granted a petition signed by Denis-Benjamin Papineau and over 75 tenants for the formation of a parish. His decree called the new parish Notre-Dame-de-Bonsecours-de-la-Petite-Nation and also recommended the people of Bonsecours to acquire civil recognition from the Governor General of Canada, Lord Aylmer.

On June 18, 1845, the Governor General of the Province of Canada, Charles Metcalfe, established local and municipal authorities in Lower Canada, under a new law passed by the provincial Parliament. One of the new municipalities established was the Municipality of Petite-Nation, which included the Parish of Notre-Dame-de-Bonsecours-de-la-Petite-Nation. However, this municipality was abolished in 1847.

On July 1, 1855, a new statute of the Province of Canada came into force, which allowed the parish to get official civilian recognition, known as Parish Municipality of Notre-Dame-de-Bon-Secours-de-la-Petite-Nation.

On August 22, 1878, Montebello separated from the parish municipality.

In the 1870s, the Quebec, Montreal, Ottawa and Occidental Railway was built, connecting Montreal to Ottawa. The rail-line went through the municipality of Notre-Dame, in the area of the municipality which is now Fassett. The Canadian Pacific Railway bought the line in 1882.

In the late 1890s, there was a dispute between the municipality of Notre-Dame-de-Bonsecours and the Canadian Pacific Railway, which resulted in a court case that went all the way to the Judicial Committee of the Privy Council in Britain, the highest court of appeal for the British Empire. A ditch beside the rail-line had become clogged, resulting in flooding on the neighbouring land, owned by Julien Gervais. The municipality issued an order to the CPR, directing it to clean the obstruction. The CPR refused, arguing that as a federally incorporated railway, it was not required to comply with provincial law. The Quebec courts held that the provincial law did apply, and the CPR appealed to the Judicial Committee. In 1899, the Judicial Committee ruled in favour of the municipality and upheld the order to clean the ditch, in the case of Canadian Pacific Railway Co. v Notre Dame de Bonsecours. The decision of the Judicial Committee continues to be cited with approval by the Supreme Court of Canada.

In 1918, the large rural and forested area of the parish municipality separated and formed the Parish Municipality of Notre-Dame-de-Bon-Secours-Partie-Nord. In 1951, the Parish Municipality of Notre-Dame-de-Bon-Secours became the Municipality of Fassett. And in 2003, the Parish Municipality of Notre-Dame-de-Bon-Secours-Partie-Nord became the Municipality of Notre-Dame-de-Bonsecours.

== Demographics ==
Canada census – Notre-Dame-de-Bonsecours community profile

| | 2021 | 2016 | 2011 |
| Population | 285 (-5.3% from 2016) | 301 (15.3% from 2011) | 261 (-5.1% from 2006) |
| Land area | 258.36 km^{2} (99.75 sq mi) | 264.97 km^{2} (102.31 sq mi) | 266.90 km^{2} (103.05 sq mi) |
| Population density | 1.1/km^{2} (2.8/sq mi) | 1.1/km^{2} (2.8/sq mi) | 1.0/km^{2} (2.6/sq mi) |
| Median age | 55.2 (M: 56.8, F: 54) | 54.2 (M: 53.5, F: 55.5) | 52.2 (M: 52.0, F: 52.3) |
| Private dwellings | 130 (total) | 202 (total) | 158 (total) |
| Median household income | $70,500 | $47,488 | $64,012 |

References: 2021 2016 2011

Historical census populations – Notre-Dame-de-Bonsecours, Quebec
| Year | Pop. | ±% |
|---|---|---|
| 1921 | 524 | — |
| 1931 | 512 | −2.3% |
| 1941 | 341 | −33.4% |
| 1951 | 320 | −6.2% |
| 1956 | 350 | +9.4% |
| 1961 | 295 | −15.7% |
| 1966 | 269 | −8.8% |
| 1971 | 246 | −8.6% |
| 1976 | 253 | +2.8% |
| 1981 | 263 | +4.0% |
| 1986 | 300 | +14.1% |
| 1991 | 248 | −17.3% |
| 1996 | 273 | +10.1% |
| 2001 | 284 | +4.0% |
| 2006 | 275 | −3.2% |
| 2011 | 261 | −5.1% |
| 2016 | 301 | +15.3% |
| 2021 | 285 | −5.3% |
Source: Statistics Canada

Mother tongue:

- English as first language: 5.1%
- French as first language: 91.5%
- English and French as first language: 3.4%
- Other as first language: 0%

== Education ==
Sir Wilfrid Laurier School Board operates Anglophone public schools:

- Laurentian Regional High School in Lachute
