= JewishFiction.net =

JewishFiction.net is an online literary journal founded in 2010 by Nora Gold, who is also its editor-in-chief. JewishFiction.net is currently the only English-language journal, either in print or online, devoted exclusively to the publishing of Jewish fiction. Its mandate is to publish first-rate Jewish fiction from around the world and to give international exposure to Jewish literature. In its first ten years, JewishFiction.net has published 400 stories or novel excerpts (never before published in English) that were either written in English or translated into English from fifteen languages: French, Spanish, Italian, Danish, Russian, Romanian, Hungarian, Serbian, Polish, Croatian, German, Turkish, Ladino, Hebrew, and Yiddish.

JewishFiction.net features work by both established and emerging writers. Just a few examples of the eminent authors published to date in JewishFiction.net are Elie Wiesel, Chava Rosenfarb, Aharon Appelfeld, Nava Semel, and A.B. Yehoshua. JewishFiction.net is issued 2-3 times annually and has readers in 140 countries.
