= Alan B. Gold =

Former chief justice of the Quebec Superior Court

Alan B. Gold OC OQ

Chief justice of the Quebec Superior Court
- In office 1983–1992
- Preceded by: Jules Deschênes
- Succeeded by: Lawrence Poitras

Personal details
- Born: Alan Bernard Gold; July 21, 1917 Montreal, Quebec, Canada
- Died: May 15, 2005 (aged 87)
- Resting place: Baron de Hirsch Cemetery, Montreal
- Spouse: Lynn Gold
- Children: Marc Gold; Nora Gold; Daniel Gold

Alan Bernard Gold OC OQ (July 21, 1917 – May 15, 2005) was the chief justice of the Quebec Superior Court from 1983 to 1992.

Born in Montreal, Gold received a B.A. from Queen's University in 1938 and a bachelor's degree in civil law from the University of Montreal in 1941. He was called to the Bar of Quebec in 1942, but first served with the Royal Canadian Artillery during World War II. As an arbitrator, he helped avoid a strike by the longshoremen at the Port of Montreal in 1968. In 1970, he was named chief judge of the Provincial Court of Quebec, now known as the Court of Quebec.

In 1990, he negotiated a settlement between the Quebec government and the Mohawk people in the Oka standoff. In 1993, he negotiated a settlement at Nationair, bringing the 16-month-long Lockout of its Flight Attendants to an end.

In 1993, after he had retired from the bench, he joined Davies Ward Phillips & Vineberg LLP, a Montréal law firm. He represented the government of Saskatchewan in negotiating a settlement in the wrongful conviction of David Milgaard. He reviewed the out-of-court settlement between former Prime Minister Brian Mulroney and the federal government in Mulroney's anti-defamation suit in the alleged Airbus affair.

He served as chair of the board of Governors of McGill University, Chancellor of Concordia University and Associate Governor at the Université de Montréal. He served as Chairman of the Bar of Montreal's committee on access to justice in the English language in the judicial district of Montreal whose Report was submitted on March 31, 1995.

Gold was made an Officer of the Order of Canada in 1995 and was named a member of the Académie des Grands Montréalais in 1997. In 1985, he was made an Officer of the National Order of Quebec.

He died in 2005 at the age of 87. His son, Marc Gold, was appointed to the Senate of Canada in 2016.
