= Liane Davey =

Psychologist, author, public speaker, and business strategist

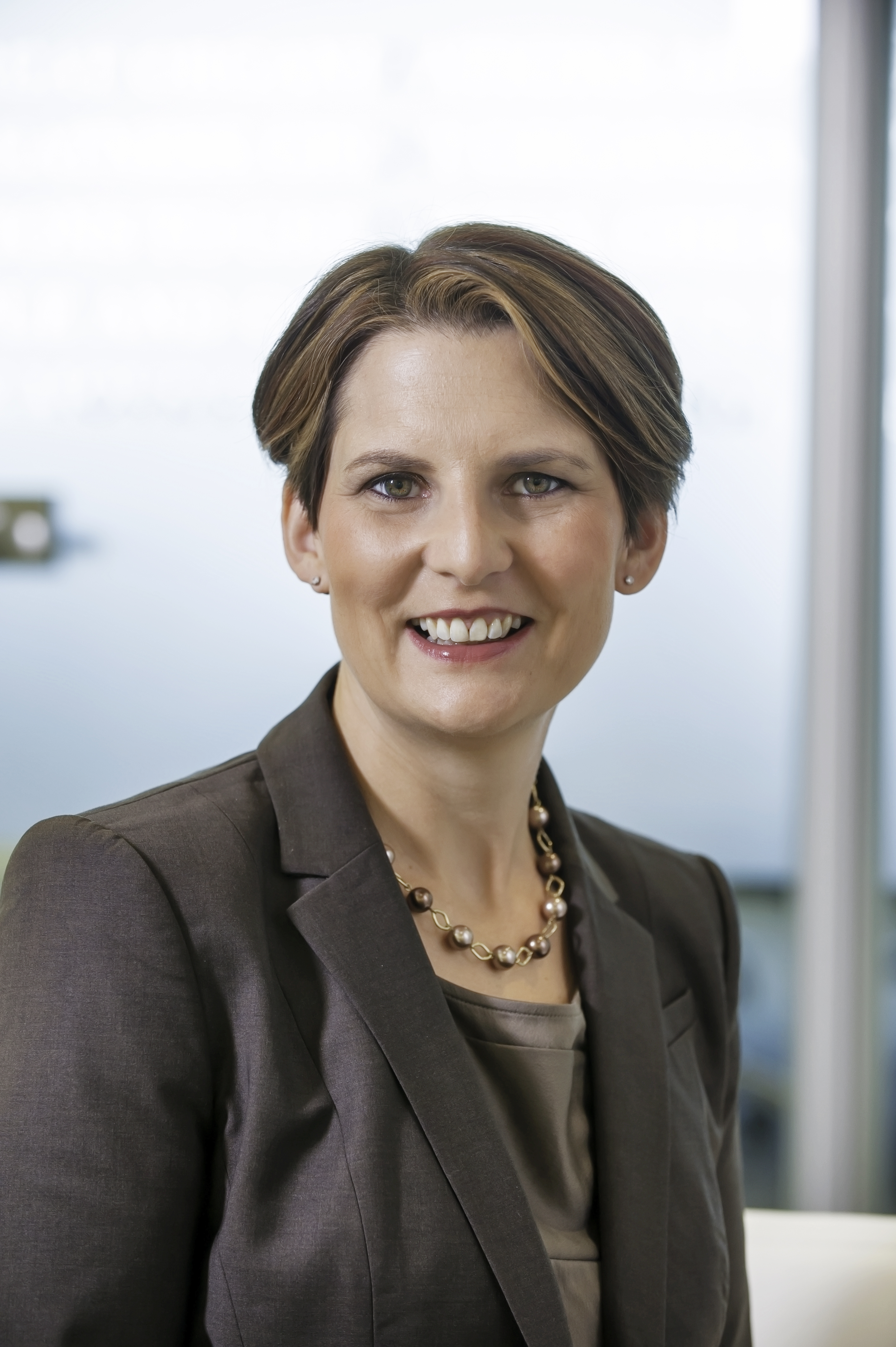
- Liane Davey in 2014
- Born: February 7, 1972 (age 54); Toronto, Canada
- Education: University of Western Ontario; University of Waterloo
- Occupations: psychologist; author; public speaker; business strategist
- Website: www.lianedavey.com

Liane Margaret Davey (born 1972) is a psychologist, author, public speaker, and business strategist.

== Education and career ==
During 1989 to 1993 Davey completed an Honours Bachelor of Arts in Psychology at the University of Western Ontario, and from 1993 to 1999 completed both a Master of Applied Science and a Ph.D. in Industrial/Organizational Psychology at the University of Waterloo. She published several papers including Preference for the Merit Principle Scale: An Individual Difference Measure of Distributive Justice Preferences and Justice-based opposition to social policies: Is it genuine? She was employed as a Senior Consultant at Watson Wyatt from 1998 to 2005 and then joined Knightsbridge Human Capital Solutions where she presently serves as Vice President of Team Solutions.

Davey has served on the executive of the Canadian Society for Industrial/Organizational Psychology and as an evaluator for the APA Psychologically Healthy Workplace Awards. She is currently a member of the Board of Trustees of the Psychology Foundation and is Chair of the Foundation's Diversity in Action project promoting mental health in immigrant communities.

She was asked for her opinion on leading through a crisis by journalists covering the Deepwater Horizon oil spill.

== Publications ==
Davey co-authored her first book, Leadership Solutions: The Pathway to Bridge the Leadership Gap in 2010 with David S. Weiss and Vince Molinaro on the topic of leadership, but more recently she has been focussed on teams. Specifically, in her second book, You First: Inspire Your Team to Grow Up, Get Along, and Get Stuff Done her thesis is that although healthy teams can be highly productive, they can sometimes slip into counter-productive behaviors that undercut the intended productivity benefit. She identifies several such pathologies; first, glibly agreeable behavior ("Bobblehead teams"); second, teams that only act when a disaster strikes ("Crisis junkies"); third, teams that engage in passive-aggressive backstabbing ("Bleeding Back teams"); fourth, teams where most members sit around and watch one or two members do all the work ("Spectator teams"); and last, teams that engage in fighting for fighting's sake ("Royal Rumble teams").

She claims that a single team member who recognizes these bad habits (the "You" in the book's title, "You First") can cure the whole team by practicing five counteracting habits; first, cure any jaundiced attitude by adopting a fresh start with a positive assumption; second, add one's full value; third, amplify other voices; fourth, know when to say no; and last embrace productive conflict.

In October 2013, her book ranked #8 and #7 on two New York Times Bestseller Lists, namely "Hardcover Business Books" and "Advice, How-to, & Miscellaneous," respectively. In addition, it ranked #67 overall in USA Today Bestselling Books that same month.

== See also ==
- List of University of Waterloo people
