= Jules Deschênes =

Canadian judge (1923–2000)

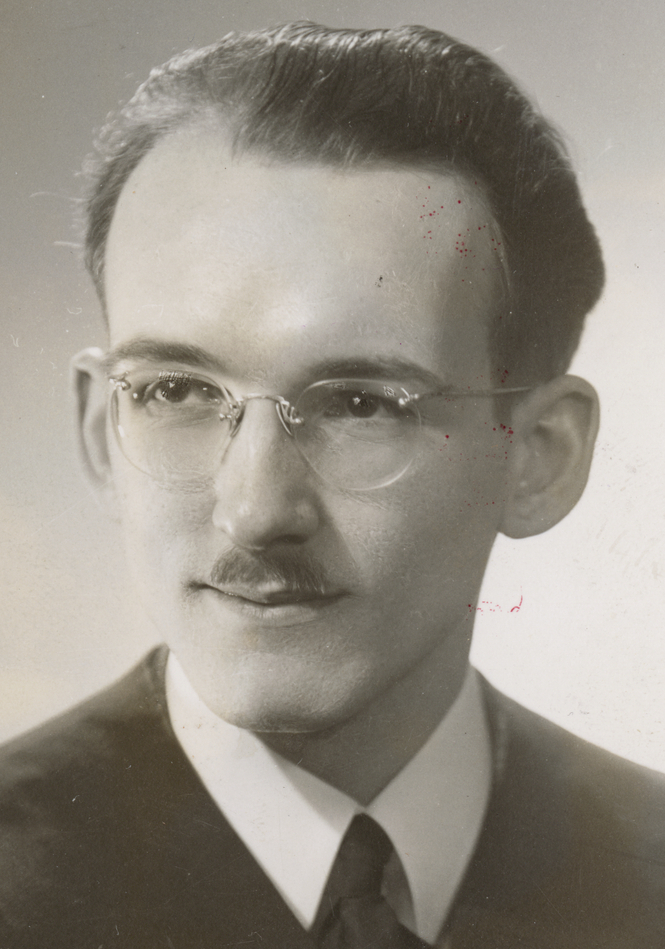
- Deschênes in 1947

Chief Justice of the Quebec Superior Court
- In office 1973–1983
- Preceded by: Frédéric Dorion
- Succeeded by: Alan B. Gold

Personal details
- Born: June 7, 1923 Montreal, Quebec
- Died: May 10, 2000 (aged 76) Laval, Quebec
- Resting place: Notre Dame des Neiges Cemetery

Jules Deschênes, CC FRSC (June 7, 1923 – May 10, 2000) was a Canadian Quebec Superior Court judge.

Born in Montreal, to Wilfrid Deschênes and Berthe Bérard, he completed grade school under the supervision of les Clercs de Saint-Viateur and classical studies under les Messieurs de Saint-Sulpice. He graduated from the University of Montreal and was admitted to the Bar of Quebec in 1946.

From 1946 to 1960 he practiced law. In 1961, he was named Queen's Counsel. In 1962 he was elected to the Council of the Bar of Montreal. In 1962 he started to teach law at the University of Montreal.

On January 8, 1964 he accepted to prosecute at the Commission of Inquiry into the famous Coffin affair. In 1972 he was appointed a Justice of the Quebec Court of Appeal. In 1973 he was appointed, by Pierre Trudeau, Chief Justice of the Quebec Superior Court. He served in this position for ten years.

From 1984 to 1987 he was involved with the United Nations Sub-Commission on the Prevention of Discrimination and the Protection of Minorities. In 1985 he was appointed to head the Commission of Inquiry on War Criminals in Canada on alleged war criminals in Canada in which he officially reprimanded those special interest groups within the Jewish Canadian community whom, he wrote, had tabled "grossly exaggerated" claims about the number of alleged war criminals supposedly hiding in Canada. He submitted his report in 1986.

He was the 102^{nd} president of the Royal Society of Canada from 1990 until 1992. From 1993 to 1997, he sat on the International Criminal Tribunal for the former Yugoslavia.

He published his autobiography, Sur la ligne de feu, in 1988. After his death in 2000, he was entombed at the Notre Dame des Neiges Cemetery in Montreal.

He married Jacqueline Lachapelle in 1948. They had two daughters and three sons.

== Honours ==
- In 1977 he was elected a Fellow of the Royal Society of Canada.
- In 1981 he received an honorary doctorate from Concordia University.
- In 1989 he was made an Officer of the Order of Canada and was promoted to Companion in 1992.

Professional and academic associations
Preceded by Digby McLaren	President of the Royal Society of Canada; 1990–1992	Succeeded by John Meisel
