= Madden v Nelson and Fort Sheppard Railway Co. =

Canadian constitutional law – federal railways (1899)

- Map of the Nelson and Fort Sheppart Railway (in red)
- Court: Judicial Committee of the Privy Council
- Full case name: Madden and another and Attorney General for British Columbia v Nelson and Fort Sheppard Railway Company
- Decided: July 19, 1899
- Citation: [1899] AC 626, [1899] UKPC 47

Case history
- Appealed from: Supreme Court of British Columbia (Full Court)

Court membership
- Judges sitting: Earl of Halsbury, LC; Lord Watson; Lord Hobhouse; Lord Macnaghten; Sir Edward Fry; Sir Henry Strong, CJC

Case opinions
- Decision by: Earl of Halsbury, LC

Keywords
- Canadian federalism

Madden v Nelson and Fort Sheppard Railway Co. is a Canadian constitutional law decision, dealing with the application of provincial laws to federally regulated railways. The Judicial Committee of the Privy Council, at that time the highest appellate body in the British Empire, held that the provinces could not impose higher safety standards on federally regulated railways than were set out in federal law.

== Facts ==
The Nelson and Fort Sheppard Railway was a railway in southern British Columbia. It ran from the town of Nelson, British Columbia to the town of Fort Shepherd on the Canadian-US border at Waneta. The railway was originally incorporated under provincial law in 1891, but in 1893 it was transferred to federal jurisdiction, as a "work for the general advantage of Canada".

In 1891, the British Columbia legislature enacted the Cattle Protection Act, 1891. That Act provided that if a railway failed to erect fencing along its rail-line and a farm animal was injured by the operation of the railway, the railway was civilly liable in damages to the owner of the animal.

This case arose when two horses owned by Madden were struck by a train operated by the Nelson and Fort Sheppard Railway. One was killed in the collision and the other had to be put down. Madden sued the railway for the value of the two horses.

== Decisions of the British Columbia courts ==
Madden brought his action in the local County Court, relying on the provincial statute. That court, sitting with judge and jury, found the railway was liable and awarded damages.

The railway then appealed to the Full Court of the Supreme Court of British Columbia. Counsel for the railway was Lyman Duff, who went on to become the Chief Justice of Canada, and an expert in the division of powers between the federal and provincial governments. Duff argued that the provincial requirement to erect fences conflicted with the safety regulations set out in the federal railway legislation. The province could not add to the safety regulations set out in federal law.

In a unanimous decision, the British Columbia Supreme Court agreed with Duff's argument. They overturned the County Court decision and set aside the damages award.

== Decision of the Judicial Committee of the Privy Council ==
At that time, the Judicial Committee of the Privy Council was the highest appellate body for the British Empire. Litigants could appeal directly to the Judicial Committee, bypassing the Supreme Court of Canada. Madden appealed the decision of the British Columbia Supreme Court to the Judicial Committee, sitting in London. The Attorney General for British Columbia intervened in the appeal in support of the legislation.

In a short decision given by the Lord Chancellor, the Earl of Halsbury, the Judicial Committee dismissed Madden's appeal. The Lord Chancellor held that it was no answer to say that the federal statute was silent on the issue of protective fences. The jurisdiction to regulate the railway lay with the federal government, and the provincial government could not pass legislation that it thought the federal government should have enacted, as was set out in the preamble to the Cattle Protection Act. He concluded that the Act was not within provincial jurisdiction and was "manifestly ultra vires".

The Lord Chancellor also referred to the Judicial Committee's recent decision, Canadian Pacific Railway Co. v Notre Dame de Bonsecours, decided in March, 1899, four months before Madden. That case had held that a provincial law requiring property owners to keep their property in good condition did apply to a federally regulated railway, because the law did not purport to require the railway to change its physical structure. The Lord Chancellor distinguished the Madden case from Notre Dame de Bonsecours, saying: "... in this case there is the actual provision that there shall be a liability on the railway company unless they create such and such works upon their roadway. This is manifestly and clearly beyond the jurisdiction of the provincial legislature."

== Significance of the decision ==
=== Subsequent decisions ===
The Supreme Court of Canada continues to cite the Madden case with approval, for the proposition that provincial laws cannot regulate the specifically federal nature of federally regulated works and undertakings. The case has acquired particular significance in environmental law cases, along with the related case of Notre Dame de Bonsecours. Taken together, the two cases help to set out the boundary for provincial jurisdiction over federally-regulated works and undertakings.

In 2019, the British Columbia Court of Appeal cited Madden and Notre Dame de Bonsecours in its decision holding that the province could not regulate the product shipped on a federally regulated pipeline. On appeal, the Supreme Court unanimously dismissed the appeal, "...for the unanimous reasons of the Court of Appeal for British Columbia."

=== Department of Justice collection of cases ===
In 1949, the Parliament of Canada abolished appeals to the Judicial Committee. The federal Department of Justice then published a three-volume collection of significant constitutional decisions of the Judicial Committee. The Madden case was included in that collection.
