= Canadian Pacific Railway Co. v Notre Dame de Bonsecours =

Canadian constitutional law case - JCPC

Canadian Pacific Railway Company v Notre Dame de Bonsecours
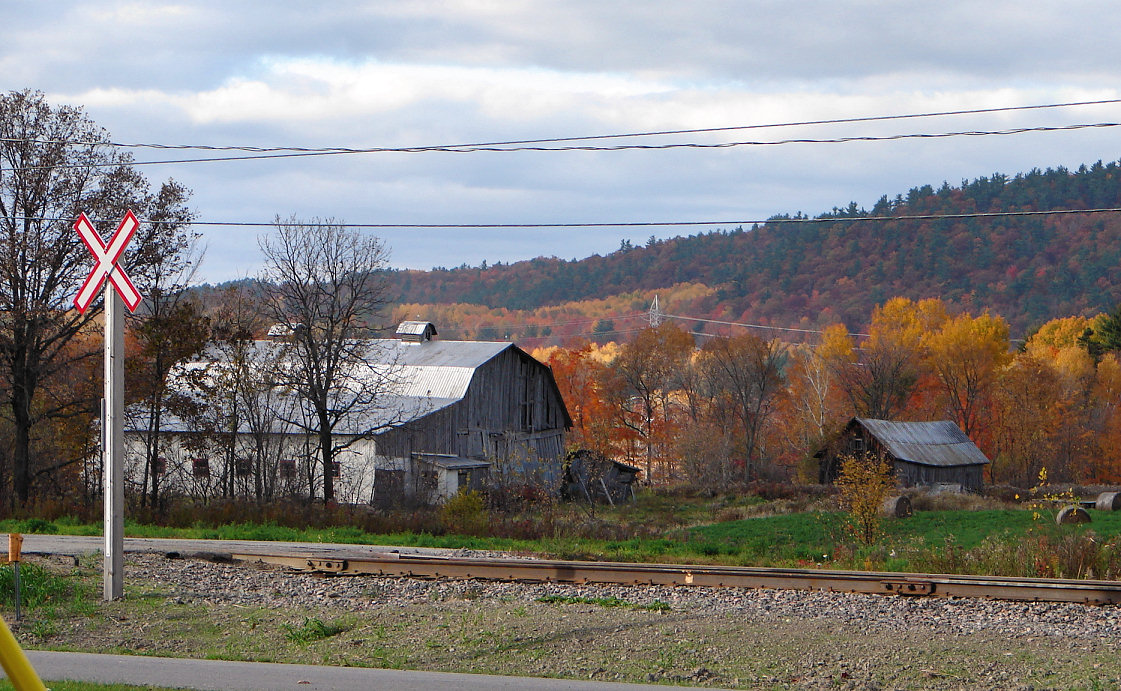
- The railway through Notre-Dame-de-Bonsecours (now the village of Fassett)
- Court: Judicial Committee of the Privy Council
- Full case name: Canadian Pacific Railway Company v Corporation of the Parish of Notre Dame de Bonsecours
- Decided: March 24, 1899
- Citations: [1899] AC 367; [1899] UKPC 22

Case history
- Appealed from: Cie de Chemin de Fer Canadien du Pacifique v Notre-Dame-de-Bonsecours (Paroisse), 1897 CarswellQue 80, 7 Que. QB 121 Quebec Court of Queen's Bench

Court membership
- Judges sitting: Earl of Halsbury, LC; Lord Watson; Lord Hobhouse; Lord Macnaghten; Lord Morris; Lord Shand; Lord Davey

Case opinions
- Provincial laws apply to federally regulated railways, provided the laws do not regulate the construction and management of the railway
- Decision by: Lord Watson

Keywords
- Constitutional division of powers; municipal law; federally regulated works and undertakings

Canadian Pacific Railway Co. v Notre Dame de Bonsecours is a Canadian constitutional law decision, dealing with the powers of the provinces under the Constitution Act, 1867 (formerly the British North America Act, 1867). The point in issue was whether the Canadian Pacific Railway Company, a federally regulated railway, was required to comply with an order issued by a municipality under provincial law. The municipal order required the CPR Co. to clean a ditch beside its rail line, which had become blocked and flooded neighbouring land, under penalty of $20 per day until the ditch was cleared.

The case arose in the province of Quebec and was appealed to the Judicial Committee of the Privy Council in Britain, at that time the highest court of appeal for the British Empire. The Judicial Committee held that the provincial law applied to the railway provided it did not regulate the structure or operation of the railway.

The case is a foundational case for the scope of provincial legislation over federally regulated works and undertakings, and continues to be cited regularly by the Supreme Court of Canada. It has particular significance in environmental law cases.

== Facts ==
Notre-Dame-de-Bonsecours was a parish municipality, in the Outaouais region of Quebec, incorporated under provincial law. The Canadian Pacific Railway Company, or CPR Co., is a federally incorporated railway company. Its North Shore line, connecting Montreal to Ottawa, crossed through Notre-Dame-de-Bonsecours.

The railway ran parallel to property owned by one Julien Gervais and included a ditch along the property line. The ditch had become blocked, resulting in an overflow of water onto Gervais's property. The municipality served an order on the CPR Co. under the Municipal Code of Quebec, directing it to clear the obstruction in the ditch, under penalty of paying $20 per day for failing to comply with the order. The CPR Co. asserted that it was not bound by provincial law and did not have to comply with the order. That triggered the resulting lawsuit in the courts of Quebec and eventually the Judicial Committee, as the municipality sought to enforce its order and the accumulated penalty of $200. The CPR Co. continued to resist.

== Constitutional provisions ==
The case turned on the division of powers between the federal and provincial governments under the Constitution Act, 1867. Section 92(10)(a) and section 91(29), taken together, assign to the federal Parliament the exclusive power to regulate "Railways,... and other Works and Undertakings connecting the Province with any other or others of the Provinces, or extending beyond the Limits of the Province".

However, the Constitution Act, 1867 also assigns the provinces exclusive jurisdiction over municipalities (s. 92(8)), property and civil rights in the province (s. 92(13)), and local matters (s. 92(16)). The issue was whether the railway, as a federally regulated "work or undertaking" was required to comply with the municipal order to clean its ditch, an order made under provincial law, or whether that order was an impermissible provincial attempt to regulate a federal railway.

== Decisions of Quebec courts ==
The matter went first to the Superior Court of Quebec, which upheld the municipal order to remove the blockage from the ditch. Justice Melhiot held that the railway company was subject to the Municipal Code.

CPR Co. then appealed to the Quebec Court of Queen's Bench, which dismissed the appeal by a 4-1 decision. Speaking for the majority, Justice Bossé resolved the constitutional issue by relying on a provision of the federal Railway Act, which provided that provincial laws passed prior to the Railway Act continued to apply to federally regulated railways. Since the Municipal Code predated the Railway Act, he held that the municipal order was valid.

Justice Hall dissented and held that the Municipal Code did not apply. Instead, he concluded that the municipality was required to apply to the federal Railway Committee for an order under the Railway Act directing the CPR Co. to remove the blockage.

== Appeal to Judicial Committee ==
The CPR Co. then appealed to the Judicial Committee of the Privy Council, sitting in London. Edward Blake, QC and Tyrell Paine acted for the CPR Co., while Richard Haldane, QC and Gerald Hohler acted for the municipality. The Committee gave its decision on March 24, 1899, dismissing the appeal.

Lord Watson gave the decision for the committee. He held that the federal government has extensive powers to regulate the construction, repair and alteration of the railway, as well as the management, constitution and powers of the railway company. However, federally regulated railways do not cease to be part of the province in which they are located and continue to be subject to provincial law.

Applying these principles, Lord Watson stated that the province could not attempt to dictate how the railway built the ditch, but if the ditch became choked with rubbish and caused an overflow onto neighbouring property, an order directing that the ditch be cleaned would be within provincial authority. He concluded that on the facts of the case, the municipality was simply seeking to have the obstruction removed, without any change to the structure of the ditch, and therefore the order applied to the CPR Co.

As a result, the Committee advised Her Majesty that the appeal should be dismissed, affirming the judgment below, with court costs to be paid by the railway company.

== Significance ==
=== Subsequent decisions ===
The Supreme Court of Canada continues to cite the Notre Dame de Bonsecours case with approval, for the proposition that provincial laws apply to federally regulated works and undertakings as long as they do not attempt to regulate the specifically federal character of the work or undertaking. The case has acquired particular significance in environmental law cases, supporting the proposition that provincial environmental laws relating to the release of pollutants into the environment apply to federally regulated works and undertakings. For example, in Ontario v Canadian Pacific, the Supreme Court held, in short reasons from the bench, that an environmental law applied to the CPR Co., citing Notre-Dame-de-Bonsecours. The courts have continued to apply that principle.

More recently, in 2019 the British Columbia Court of Appeal cited Notre-Dame-de-Bonsecours in its decision that the province could not regulate the amount or type of product shipped on an inter-provincial pipeline, as that would intrude on the scope of federal regulation of the operation of the pipeline. In 2020, in a decision from the bench, the Supreme Court of Canada dismissed British Columbia's appeal, "for the unanimous reasons of the Court of Appeal for British Columbia."

=== Department of Justice collection of cases ===
The federal Department of Justice included this decision in the three volume collection of constitutional decisions of the Judicial Committee which the department published when appeals to the Judicial Committee were abolished.
