= Vince Molinaro =

Business strategist

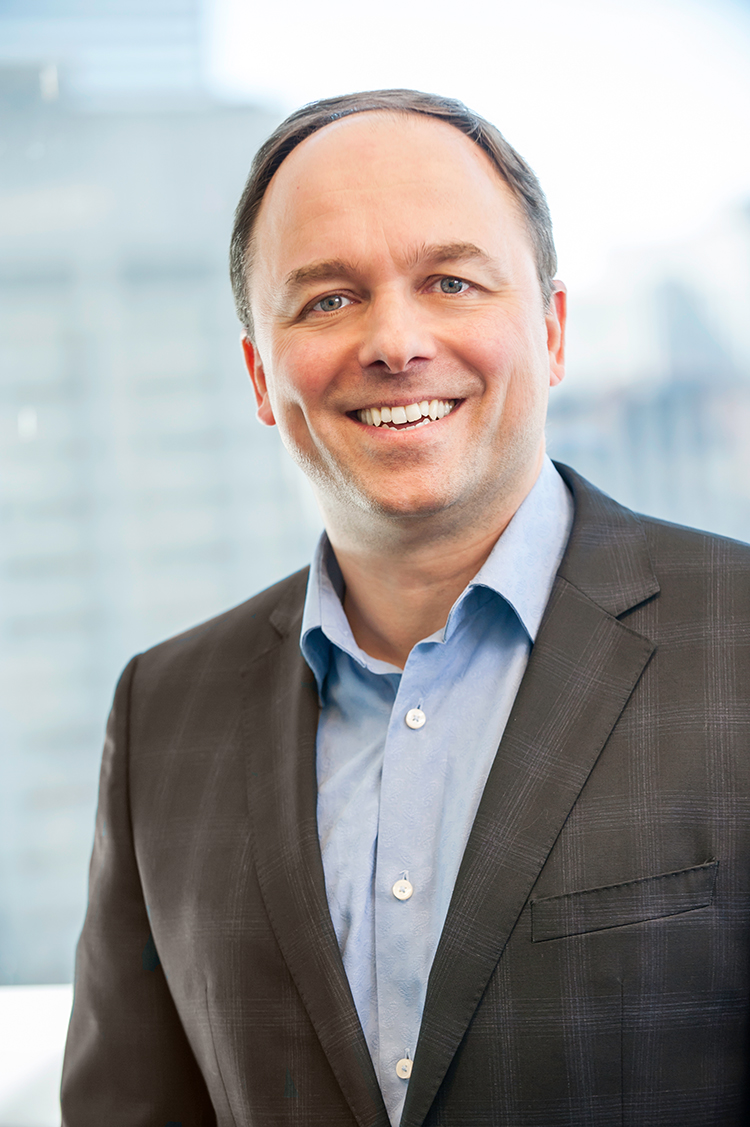
- Molinaro in 2014
- Born: 1962 (age 63–64)
- Education: Brock University; McMaster University; University of Toronto (PhD 1997)
- Occupations: business strategist; leadership adviser; author
- Website: drvincemolinaro.com

Venanzio "Vince" Molinaro (born 1962) is a business strategist and leadership adviser. He is the author of several books, including Accountable Leaders. Molinaro is the reference founder and CEO of Leadership Contract Inc.

== Education and career ==
Molinaro has degrees from Brock University and McMaster University and received his doctorate from the Department of Education, University of Toronto. For doctoral research he interviewed four employees and their co-workers about an approach to work which was based not on materialism but on substance, spirituality, reflective practice, and on building strong relationships with others. The resulting doctoral thesis was entitled Holism at work, exploring the experiences of individuals creating a new holistic story of work.

== Authorship ==
Molinaro's first two books, The Leadership Gap and Leadership Solutions, were co-authored with David S. Weiss and Liane Davey.The Leadership Gap ranked #3 on list of best selling business books by the Canadian newspaper The Globe and Mail in May 2011. It claims that the growth of an organization can outstrip its capacity to cultivate a sufficient quantity of leaders, and that this "leadership gap" can be corrosive. The book proposes a system for identifying high priority gaps and filling them. Reviewing the book in the Journal of Organizational Excellence, LaRoi Lawton said, "The highly motivated, self-directed reader can gain a great deal of learning and other results from using the guidelines and materials in this timely book." Writing about the book in CMA Management magazine, Robert Coleman stated "Building leadership capacity for the future can be a challenge, and pundits have started to jump into the fray." The book review in the same issue comments that "The Leadership Gap provides a road map for creating such an [leadership development] environment."

His book, The Leadership Contract, claims the majority of employees accept leadership positions without "reading the fine print." He draws on an analogy to web site users who accept the terms of service of the site without ever reading them. He advocates that an employee who wants to cut through bureaucratic sclerosis and make changes in their organizations instead make a conscious decision to lead, going so far as to write down, sign, and date an explicit "leadership contract" with herself or himself.

The book ranked #4 on The New York Times Best Seller list in the Hard cover business books category for the month of September 2013 and #3 in the Advice, how-to, & miscellaneous category for August 2013. In a five-star review at Goodreads, Carolyn Kost found the book inspiring. Writing for Inc. magazine, Minda Zetlin comments that making these four commitments may determine effectiveness. In a review for a Colorado State University magazine, Sara Daubert says the book "offers practical suggestions" but cautions that some of the examples are "more remedial" in nature and that some are "lengthy and lack relevance."

Molinaro contributed three articles for the book The Trainer's Portable Mentor edited by Terrence L. Gargiulo, namely "The Synergy of Co-Facilitation: Creating Powerful Learning Experiences", "The Integrated Approach to Leadership Development" (with David Weiss), and "The Trainer as a CAPABLE Leader" (also with Weiss). For the Banff Centre, he wrote "Driving Employee Engagement", again with Weiss. Nick Morgan, reviewing Molinaro's blog for Forbes, observed: "Vince's blog will make any leader stop and think about the predominant model of leadership that still exists today." He has authored two articles for Harvard Business Review, namely, "Do Millennials Really Want Their Bosses to Call Their Parents?" and "Why a Corporate Scandal Will Follow You Even If You Weren’t Involved."

In Molinaro's most recent book Accountable leaders, he seeks to address the problem of mediocre leadership by holding leaders accountable. The book was inspired in part by a revered co-worker claiming that her illness was the result of a toxic work environment. He claims accountability is what differentiates great leaders from mediocre ones. He identifies five attributes and five key drivers.

== Awards ==
Molinaro won a Thought Leaders award from the Association of Corporate Executive Coaches in 2019 in the Organizational Leadership category.
