= Ministerial Advisory Council on Rights, Equality and Inclusion =

Canadian government advisory council

Agency overview
- Formed: 1 June 2026
- Preceding agencies: Special Representative on Combatting Islamophobia; Special Envoy on Preserving Holocaust Remembrance and Combatting Antisemitism
- Agency executive: Marc Miller, Minister of Canadian Identity and Culture

The Ministerial Advisory Council on Rights, Equality and Inclusion is a Canadian government advisory council established in 2026 to "combat racism and hate in all their forms" including antisemitism. The Council will be chaired by Canadian Identity and Culture Minister Marc Miller.

== History ==
In February 2026, the Canadian Government announced that the Offices of the Special Representative on Combatting Islamophobia and the Special Envoy on Preserving Holocaust Remembrance and Combatting Antisemitism would be abolished and merged into the Council.

The Council was announced by Prime Minister of Canada Mark Carney on 1 June 2026 at the Holy Blossom Temple, a synagogue in Toronto. In Carney's speech, he described a "scourge" of antisemitism in Canada.
