= Lyse Lemieux (judge) =

Canadian judge

Chief Justice of the Quebec Superior Court
- In office 1996–2004

Personal details
- Born: 1936 (age 88–89)
- Education: Université de Montréal

Lyse Lemieux (born 1936) is the former Chief Justice of the Quebec Superior Court from 1996 until 2004. Lemieux was the first and only woman to ever hold the office of Chief Justice in the Province of Quebec until the appointment of Marie-Anne Paquette in 2022.

Lemieux studied law at the Université de Montréal and was admitted to the Bar of Quebec in 1962. She held a variety of positions in the provincial government, becoming a specialist in expropriation. Lemieux was appointed a justice of the Superior Court of Quebec in 1978 and in 1994 was named an Associate Chief Justice. In 1996, she became the first woman to ever hold the office of Chief Justice in the Province of Quebec. She resigned after being charged with driving under the influence.
