= David Solomon Weiss =

Canadian business strategist (b. 1953)

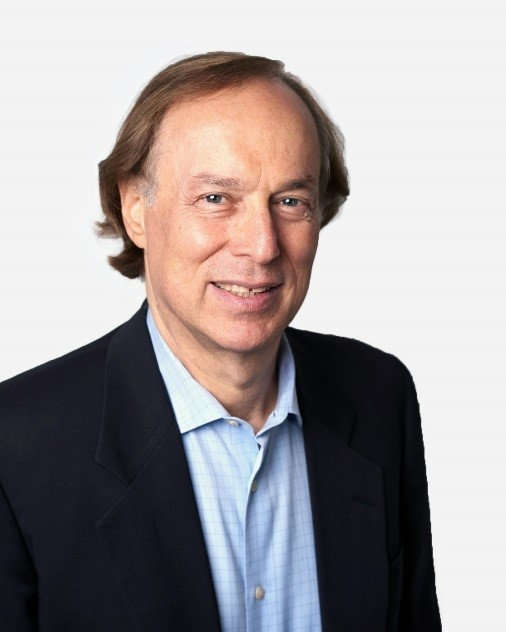
- Education: Queen’s College CUNY (B.A. 1974) Columbia University (M.A. M.Ed. 1976) Yeshiva University (M.S. 1977)
- Alma mater: University of Toronto (PhD 1981)
- Occupations: Organizational Psychologist & Business Strategist

David Solomon Weiss is an organizational psychologist and business strategist and author of seven books, including The Leadership Gap, Innovative Intelligence and Leadership-Driven HR.

== Education and career ==
David S. Weiss has post-baccalaureate degrees from Columbia University (M.A. and M.Ed.), Yeshiva University (M.S.) and University of Toronto (Ph.D.). He specialized in organizational psychology and was an organizational and business strategist as a partner of Geller, Shedletsky and Weiss (1987–2001), as vice president and chief innovation officer of Knightsbridge Human Capital Solutions (2002–2007), and as president of Weiss International Ltd (2007 to present).

Weiss is a certified director with the Institute of Corporate Directors and was a director on the Board of the Princess Margaret Cancer Centre Foundation and an advisory board member of the Institute for Performance and Learning. He was honored as the first lifetime Fellow of the Institute for Performance and Learning and as the fourth Lifetime Fellow of the Human Resources Professionals Association.

== Authorship and concepts ==
Weiss’ first book, Beyond the Walls of Conflict (translated into French) described how to apply mutual gains negotiations to enhance the likelihood of labour management peace. His second book, High Impact HR (2nd Edition called High Performance HR, 2000) explored how HR can be more strategic and how it can build people and organizational capabilities. High Impact HR was ranked as #4 on the list of best selling business books in 1999. The book describes four HR value propositions of culture, alignment, change, and ROI of human capital and introduces the concept of how HR can define HR metrics and abandon work with discipline.

Weiss's next two books were The Leadership Gap (translated into Korean) co-authored with Vince Molinaro on the topic of holistic leadership and its sequel Leadership Solutions with Vince Molinaro and Liane Davey on the topic of how to measure the leadership gap. The Leadership Gap ranked #3 on the list of best selling business books by the Canadian newspaper The Globe and Mail in May 2011. It claims that the growth of an organization can outstrip its capacity to cultivate a sufficient quantity of leaders, and that this "leadership gap" can be corrosive. The book proposes a system for identifying high priority gaps and filling them. Reviewing the book in the Journal of Organizational Excellence, LaRoi Lawton said, "The highly motivated, self-directed reader can gain a great deal of learning and other results from using the guidelines and materials in this timely book." Writing about the book in CMA Management magazine, Robert Coleman stated "Building leadership capacity for the future can be a challenge, and pundits have started to jump into the fray." The book review in the same issue comments that "The Leadership Gap provides a road map for creating such an [leadership development] environment."

His fifth book, Maimonides Cure of Souls co-authored with David Bakan and Dan Merkur explored the psychological writings of Moses Maimonides and the role of Maimonides as a precursor to the writings of Sigmund Freud. Mordechai Beck reviewed the book in the Jerusalem Post. Beck writes that the book brings up the tantalizing possibility that the Rambam (Maimonides), the great medieval thinker, acted as precursor to the originator of modern-day psychoanalysis. His sixth book Innovative Intelligence (translated to Chinese and to Persian) co-authored with Claude Legrand was a "top 5 business book for 2011" reported by CBC News. Harvey Schachter, a writer with The Globe and Mail Report on Business, referred to the book as "a road map for harnessing creativity". The book introduces the need for innovation leadership by developing ‘leaders of innovation’ who draw out from diverse teams their insights and innovative solutions to complex situations.

Weiss also wrote Decision Making for Complex Situations co-authored with Ted R Cadsby and published in the Rotman Magazine, 2017, which explores four distinct stages for handling complex situations. Each is designed to avoid the decision-making mistakes that leaders and their teams are vulnerable to when confronting complexity. His seventh book, Leadership-Driven HR describes the road map for HR to drive value for the business, guide HR to deliver value through leaders, and ensure that HR is driven to lead. Subsequently, he wrote "The Leadership-Driven HR Transformation", "South Africa Human Capital Review" and "HR: Driver of Innovation" for HR Professional. Weiss also contributed four articles for the book The Trainer's Portable Mentor edited by Terrence L. Gargiulo, namely "Taxonomy of Learning Designs", "Trusting Relationships in Learning", "The Integrated Approach to Leadership Development" (with Vince Molinaro), and "The Trainer as a CAPABLE Leader" (with Molinaro). For the Banff Centre, he wrote "Driving Employee Engagement", again with Molinaro.

Weiss's most recent articles include "Lift-off: Change management from concept to end results", which was published in Human Resources Directors, and "Meaningful Dialogue for Association Boards", published in Association Magazine in English and French
