= Alexander Shand, 1st Baron Shand =

Scottish advocate and judge

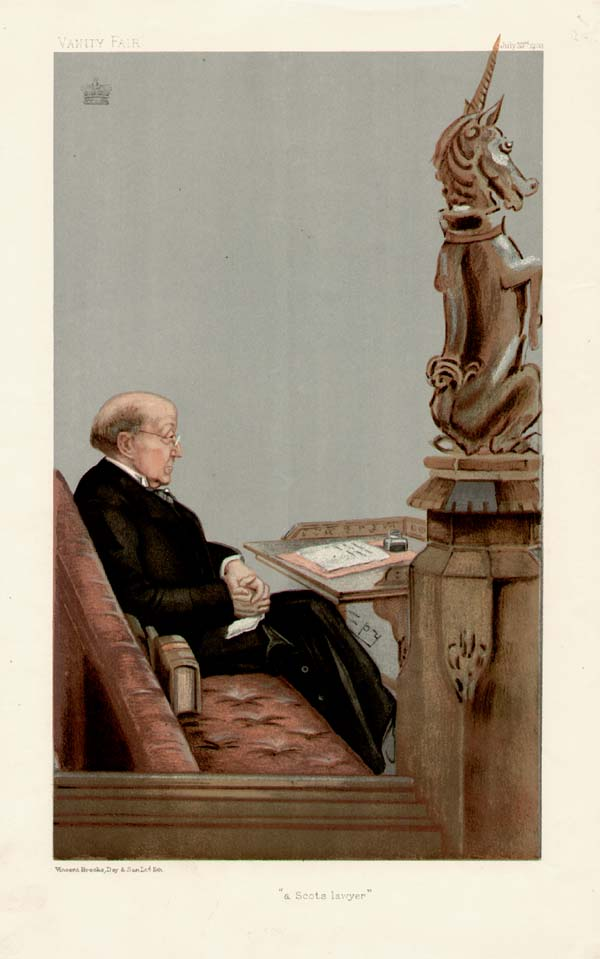
Shand caricatured by Spy in Vanity Fair, 1903

Alexander Burns Shand, 1st Baron Shand PC (13 December 1828 – 6 March 1904), was a Scottish advocate and judge. He was a Lord of Session between 1872 and 1890 and a Lord of Appeal between 1892 and his death in 1904.

== Background and education ==
Shand was the son of Alexander Shand, of Aberdeen, and Louisa (née Whyte). He studied law at the University of Edinburgh.

== Legal and judicial career ==
Shand was called to the Scottish Bar in 1853 and was an Advocate Depute at the High Court of Justiciary between 1860 and 1862. He was made Sheriff of Kincardine in 1862 and Sheriff of Haddington and Berwick from 1869 to 1872.

In 1872 he was appointed a Lord of Session under the judicial title Lord Shand, a post he held until 1890, when he retired. Moving to London for health reasons, he was sworn of the Privy Council. The same year, he took his place in the Judicial Committee of the Privy Council as a privy councillor who had held a high judicial position.

Two years later he was raised to the peerage as Baron Shand, of Woodhouse in the County of Dumfries. For the next 12 years, he heard cases in the House of Lords as an unsalaried Lord of Appeal.

== Personal life ==
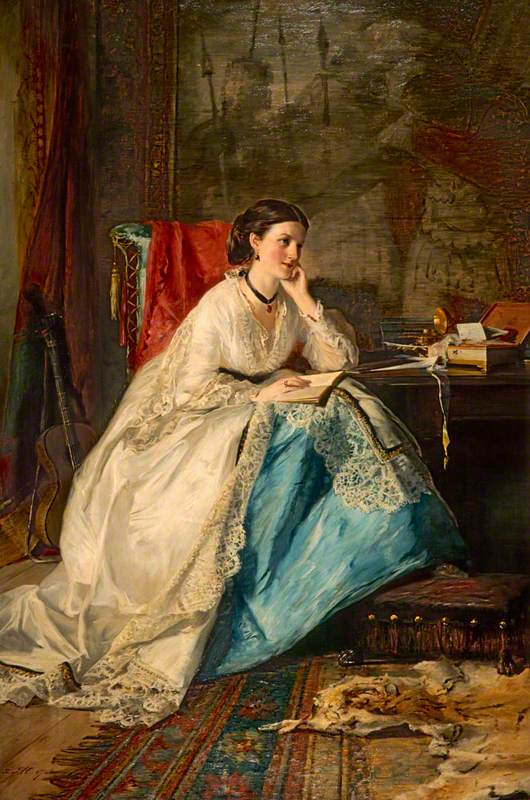
Emily Merelina Meymott, Baroness Shand

Lord Shand married Emily Merelina, daughter of John Clark Meymott, in 1857. There were no children from the marriage. He died in March 1904, aged 75, when the barony became extinct.

Peerage of the United Kingdom
New creation	Baron Shand; 1892–1904	Extinct
