= Superior Court of Quebec =

Highest trial court in Quebec, Canada

- The provincial arms as used by the Superior Court of Quebec

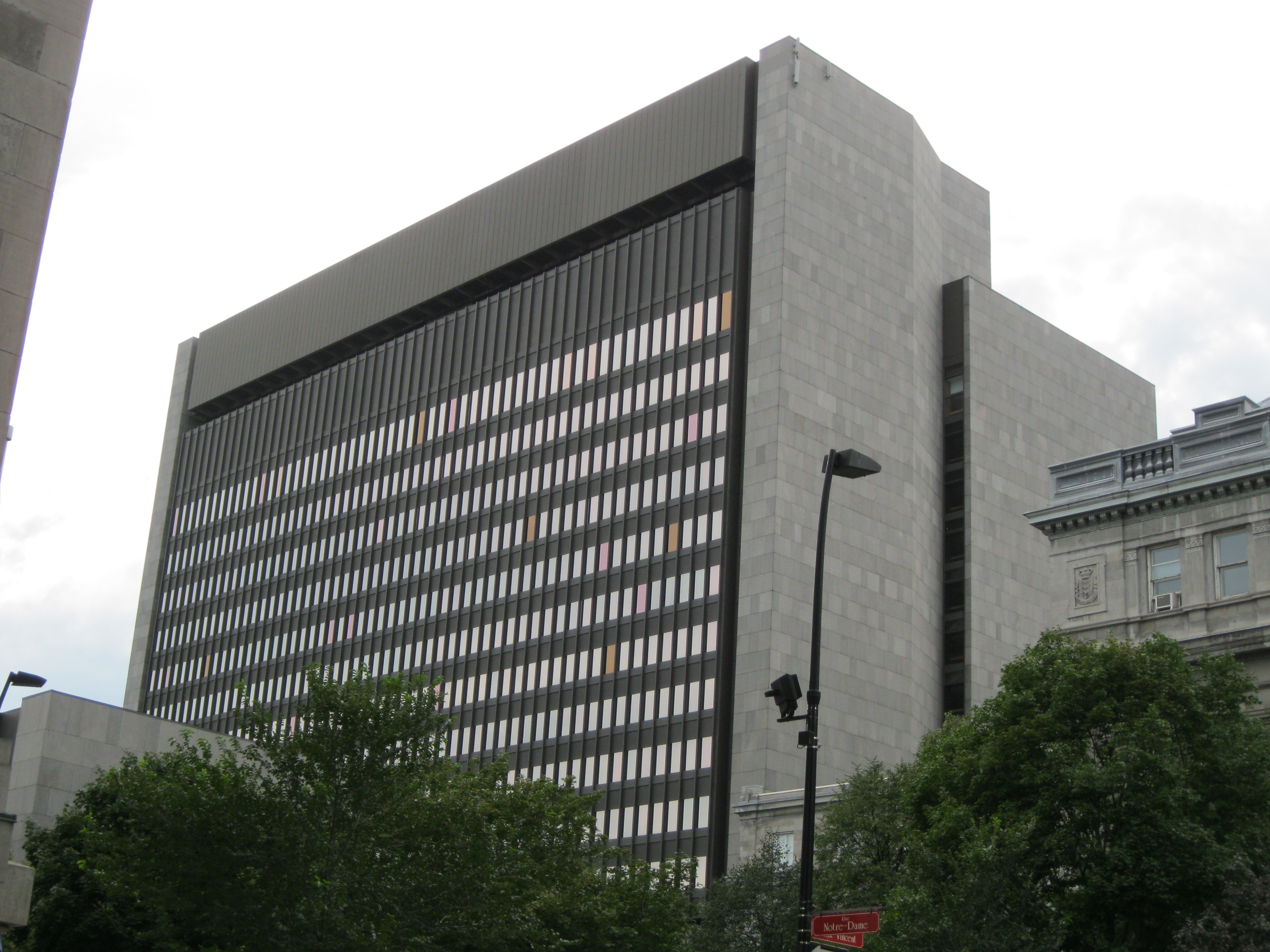
- Appeals to: Quebec Court of Appeal
- Number of positions: 157
- Website: coursuperieureduquebec.ca/en/

Chief Justice
- Currently: Marie-Anne Paquette
- Since: June 6, 2022

The Superior Court of Quebec (French: Cour supérieure du Québec) is a superior trial court in the province of Quebec, in Canada. It consists of 157 judges who are appointed by the federal government. Appeals from this court are taken to the Quebec Court of Appeal.

== Jurisdiction ==
The Superior Court of Quebec is the court of original general jurisdiction, which hears all cases not expressly assigned to another court or administrative body. It possesses both criminal and civil jurisdiction. It also hears certain appeals in criminal and penal matters. Moreover, it also possesses exclusive jurisdiction to hear and determine class actions and applications for injunctive relief.

Furthermore, the Superior Court is vested exclusive jurisdiction of judicial review over all lower courts in Quebec, over legal persons established in the public interest or for a private interest, and over partnerships and associations and other groups not endowed with juridical personality.

All criminal matters that are tried by jury must be tried by the Superior Court.

== Judges ==
The Superior Court is composed of 157 justices, including a Chief Justice, a Senior Associate Chief Justice, and an Associate Chief Justice. It can also have a maximum of 111 supernumerary judges.

=== Chief Justices ===
Chief Justices (term): [partial listing]

- Edward Bowen (1849–1866)
- Sir William Collis Meredith (1866–1884)
- Sir Andrew Stuart (1885–1889)
- Sir Francis Godschall Johnson (1889–1894)
- Sir Louis-Napoléon Casault (1894–1904)
- Sir Adolphe-Basile Routhier (1904–1906)
- Sir Melbourne McTaggart Tait
- Sir Charles Peers Davidson (1912–1915)
- Sir François-Xavier Lemieux (1915–?)
- R.A.E. Greenshields (1929–1942)
- Albert Sévigny (1942–1959)
- Frédéric Dorion (1963–1973)
- Jules Deschênes (1973–1983)
- Alan B. Gold (1983–1992)
- Lawrence A. Poitras (1992–1996)
- Lyse Lemieux (1996–2004)
- François Rolland (2004–2015)
- Jacques R. Fournier (2015–2022)
- Marie-Anne Paquette (since 2022)
