= Kindersley (surname) =

Kindersley is a surname. Notable people with the surname include:

- Charles Kindersley (1893–1958), English cricketer
- Gay Kindersley (1930–2011), British champion amateur jump jockey and horse trainer
- Hugh Kindersley, 2nd Baron Kindersley (1899–1976), British aristocrat and army officer
- Jemima Kindersley (1749–1809), English travel writer
- Nathaniel Edward Kindersley (1763–1831), translator of Tamil literature into English
- Peter Kindersley (born 1941), co-founder of the publishing company Dorling Kindersley
- Richard Kindersley (1939–2025), British typeface designer
- Richard Torin Kindersley (1792–1879), English judge and Vice-Chancellor in the Court of Chancery
- Robert Kindersley, 1st Baron Kindersley, British businessman, stockbroker, merchant banker
