= Lord Sankey's JCPC judgments =

This is a list of Lord Sankey's decisions from the Judicial Committee of the Privy Council. Sankey served as the Lord Chancellor from 7 June 1929 – 7 June 1935. Prior to his appointment to the JCPC, Sankey served as Lord Justice of Appeal in 1928 and High Court, King's Bench Division, in 1914.

== 1928-1929 ==
Year	Case Name	Citation	Author of Judgment	Lord Chancellor
1929	The Eric Beach Company Limited v The Attorney General of Ontario	[1929] UKPC 100	Merrivale	Sankey
1929	The Royal Trust Company v The Attorney General of Alberta	[1929] UKPC 93	Merrivale	Sankey
1929	Chung Chuck and others v Rex and others	[1929] UKPC 113	Sankey	Sankey
1929	Dorothy Valentine Burnard v William Douglas Lysnar	[1929] UKPC 59	Blanesburgh	Sankey
1929	The Attorney General of Canada v The Attorney General of British Columbia and others	[1929] UKPC 80	Tomlin	Sankey
1929	The Dominion Building Corporation Limited v The King	[1929] UKPC 82	Thankerton	Sankey
1929	Daniel Eugene Lecavalier v The City of Montreal	[1929] UKPC 84	Warrington of Clyffe	Sankey
1929	The Corporation of the City of St. Catherines v The Hydo-Electric Power Commission of Ontario	[1929] UKPC 85	Tomlin	Sankey
1929	Henrietta Muir Edwards and others v The Attorney-General of Canada and others	[1929] UKPC 86	Sankey	Sankey
1928	Edgar Sammut and another v Stickland	[1938] UKPC 43	Maugham	Maugham

== 1930-1931 ==
Year	Case Name	Citation	Author of Judgment	Lord Chancellor
1930	Hugh Francis Hoole and others v The Royal Trust Company and another	[1930] UKPC 74	Sankey	Sankey
1930	The Commissioner of Taxes (Appeal No. 100 of 1929) v The British Australian Wool Realization Association, Limited (in liquidation)	[1930] UKPC 89	Blanesburg	Sankey
1930	The Wanganui Sash and Door Factory and Timber Company (Appeal No. 45 of 1927) v Roland Moore Maunder and another	[1930] UKPC 9	Russell of Killowen	Sankey
1930	The Commissioner of Taxes v The Union Trustee Company of Australia, Limited	[1930] UKPC 90	Blanesburgh	Sankey
1930	The Shell Company of Australia, Limited v The Federal Commissioner of Taxation	[1930] UKPC 97	Sankey	Sankey
1931	S. P. A. Annamalay Chetty v B. A. Thornhill	[1931] UKPC 56	Thankerton	Sankey
1931	Chief Tshekedi Khama v Ratshosa and another	[1931] UKPC 72	Sanderson	Sankey
1931	The Attorney-General Canada v The Attorney-General of Ontario and others v The Attorney-General Canada	[1931] UKPC 93	Sankey	Sankey
1930	Benjamin Knowles (Reasons) v The King	[1930] UKPC 27	Dunedin	Sankey
1930	The Performing Right Society, Limited (Appeal No. 27 of 1929) v The Urban District Council of Bray	[1930] UKPC 36	Sankey	Sankey
1931	John A. Rice (Appeal No. 114 of 1930) v Frits Ricdolf Christani and another	[1931] UKPC 67	Tomlin	Sankey
1931	The Corporation of the County of Lincoln v The Corporation of the Village of Port Dalhousie	[1931] UKPC 76	MacMillan	Sankey
1930	James Richardson and Sons, Limited and another v The Ship Robert J. Paisley	[1930] UKPC 5	Merrivale	Sankey
1930	The Bank of Montreal v The Dominion Gresham Guarantee and Casualty Company	[1930] UKPC 69	Tomlin	Sankey
1930	The Canadian Pacific Railway Company and others v The Toronto Transportation Commission v The Toronto Transportation Commission and others v Canadian National Railways and others	[1930] UKPC 70	MacMillan	Sankey
1930	The Toronto Transportation Commission v Canadian National Railways and others	[1930] UKPC 71	MacMillan	Sankey

== 1932-1933 ==
Year	Case Name	Citation	Author of Judgment	Lord Chancellor
1932	Attorney General for New South Wales v Trethowan	[1932] UKPC 39	Sankey	Sankey
1932	Frederick Alexander James v The Honourable John Cowan and others	[1932] UKPC 43	Atkin	Sankey
1932	The Attorney-General or New South Wales and others v The Honourable Arthur King Trethowan M.C.L. and others and The Attorney-General or England and another	[1932] UKPC 1	Sankey	Sankey
1932	Eric George Benson v Kwong Chong	[1932] UKPC 40	Blanesburgh	Sankey
1933	The Ottawa Electric Railway Company v The Canadian National Railways	[1933] UKPC 33	Sanderson	Sankey

== 1934-1935 ==
Year	Case Name	Citation	Author of Judgment	Lord Chancellor
1934	Norwich Union Fire Insurance Society, Limited v Wm. H. Price, Limited	[1934] UKPC 24	Wright	Sankey
1934	The Pearl Assurance Company, Limited v The Government of the Union of South Africa	[1934] UKPC 43	Tomlin	Sankey
1934	In the matter of a Reference under the Judicial Committee Act, 1833, in the matter of Piracy jure gentium v JCPC	[1934] UKPC 54	Sankey	Sankey
1935	British Coal Corporation and others (Petition) v The King	[1935] UKPC 33	Sankey	Sankey
1935	Robert Lyon Moore and others (Petition) v The Attorney General for the Irish Free State and others	[1935] UKPC 34	Sankey	Sankey
1934	The United Gas and Fuel Company of Hamilton, Limited and another v The Dominion natural Gas Company, Limited	[1934] UKPC 22	MacMillan	Sankey

== 1936-1937 ==
Year	Case Name	Citation	Author of Judgment	Lord Chancellor
1937	Leonard (St. Eastcheap - Special Reference in the Benefice (Reasons) v JCPC	[1937] UKPC 17	Sankey	??
1937	Captain W. F. Wake-Walker O.B.E. R.N. v Steamer Colin W. Limited and others	[1937] UKPC 49	Sankey	??
1937	International Railway Company v The Nigara Parks Commission	[1937] UKPC 50	MacMillan	??

== 1938-1939 ==
Year	Case Name	Citation	Author of Judgment	Lord Chancellor
1939	The Apostolic Thorne of St. Jacob (His Beatitude the Armenian Patriarch of Jerusalem) v Saba Eff Said	1939 UKPC 80	Sankey	??
1939	Seyyado Ibrahim Saibo and others v Jainambeebee	[1939] UKPC 81	MacDonell	??

== 1940-1941 ==
Year	Case Name	Citation	Author of Judgment	Lord Chancellor
1940	Holford Stewart v George Alfred Francis Hancock	[1940] UKPC 18	Roche	Caldecote
1941	Olga Hall v Kingston and Saint Andrew Corporation	[1941] UKPC 1	Luxmoore	??
1941	Michel Habib Raji Ayoub and others v Sheikh Suleiman El Taji Ei Farouqi	[1941] UKPC 2	Atkin	??
1940	The Honourable John E. Brownlee v Vivian MacMillan	[1940] UKPC 36	Thankerton	Caldecote
1940	The Board of Trustees of the Lethbridge Irrigation District and another v The independent Order of Foresters and the Attorney-General of Canada and another and v The King v The Independent Order of Foresters and the Attorney-General of Canada and another (Consolidated Appeals)	[1940] UKPC 8	Caldecote	Caldecote
1940	Gywn A. True v Amalgamated Collieries of W.A. Limited	[1940] UKPC 17	Russell of Killowen	Caldecote
1940	George Richard Nicholas v The Commissioner of Taxes of the State of Victoria	[1940] UKPC 19	Thankerton	Caldecote
1941	Union of Benefices Measures 1923 to 1936 v The Ecclesiastical Commissioners for England	[1941] UKPC 12	Sankey	Caldecote

== 1942-1943 ==
Year	Case Name	Citation	Author of Judgment	Lord Chancellor
1943	Atlantic Smoke Shops Limited v James H. Conlon and others, The Attorney General of Canada and others	[1943] UKPC 44	Simon	Simon

== See also ==
- Lord Sankey's lower court judgments
- List of Judicial Committee of the Privy Council cases
- List of Judicial Committee of the Privy Council cases originating in Canada
