= List of lower court decisions by Lord Sankey =

This is a list of the lower court decisions of Lord Sankey.

== 1914-1916 ==
Year	Case Name	Citation	Court
1914	The King v Boyle and Merchant	[1914] 3 KB 339	Court of Criminal Appeal
1915	Lloyd v The Town Clerk of Shrewsbury	[1915] 1 KB 195	Divisional Court
1915	The King v The Registrar of Thetford County Court	[1915] 1 KB 224	Divisional Court
1915	The King v Richards; The King v Williams	[1915] 1 KB 299	Divisional Court
1915	May v Borup and Another	[1915] 1 KB 830	Divisional Court
1915	Barnard v Foster	[1915] 2 KB 288	King's Bench Division
1915	Gunyon v South Eastern and Chatham Railway Companies' Managing Committee	[1915] 2 KB 370	Divisional Court
1915	Tratt v Good	[1915] 3 KB 59	Divisional Court
1915	Williams v Moss' Empires, Limited	[1915] 3 KB 242	Divisional Court
1916	H. Dakin & Co., Limited v Lee	[1916] 1 KB 566	King's Bench Division and Court of Appeal
1916	Modern Transport Company, Limited v Duneric Steamship Company	[1916] 1 KB 726	King's Bench Division
1916	Palace Shipping Company, Limited v Gans Steamship Line	[1916] 1 KB 138	King's Bench Division
1916	Scottish Navigation Company, Limited v W.A. Souter & Co.	[1916] 1 KB 675	King's Bench Division
1916	The King v Sheffield Justices Ex parte Morrison	[1916] 1 KB 682	Divisional Court
1916	Watson v Winch	[1916] 1 KB 688	Divisional Court
1916	Boydel v Levant Mine Adventurers	[1916] 1 KB 692	Divisional Court
1916	Titmus v Littlewood	[1916] 1 KB 732	Divisional Court
1916	Sly v Randall	[1916] 1 KB 710	Divisional Court
1916	Cain v Butler	[1916] 1 KB 759	Divisional Court
1916	Horwood v Millar's Timber and Trading company, Limited	[1916] 2 KB 44	Divisional Court
1916	Lendon v Keen and Another	[1916] 1 KB 994	Divisional Court
1916	Sanatorium, Limited v Marshall	[1916] 2 KB 57	Divisional Court
1916	Johnston v Braham & Campbell	[1916] 2 KB 529	Divisional Court
1914-1915	Hall Bros Steamship Co, Ltd v R and W Paul, Ltd	[1914-1915] All ER Rep 234; [1914-15] All ER Rep 234	King's Bench Division
1914-1915	Palace Shipping co, Ltd v Gans Steamship Line	[1914-1915] All ER Rep 912; [1914-15] All ER Rep 912	King's Bench Division

== 1917-1919 ==
Year	Case Name	Citation	Court	
1917	Inverkip Steamship Company, Limited v Bunge & Co.	[1917] 1 KB 31	King's Bench Division	
1917	MacMillan and another v London Joint Stock Bank, Limited	[1917] 1 KB 363	King's Bench Division	
1917	Socit Nouvelle d'Armement v Spillers & Bakers, Limited	[1917] 1 KB 865	King's Bench Division	
1917	Rogers v Whittaker	[1917] 1 KB 942	King's Bench Division	
1917	Great Western Railway Company v Dafen Tinplate Company	[1917] 2 KB 177	King's Bench Division	
1917	H. Newsum & Co., Limited v Bradley and Others	[1917] 2 KB 112	King's Bench Division	
1917	The King v William Davis	[1917] 2 KB 855	Court of Criminal Appeal	
1918	Edelsten v London County Council	[1918] 1 KB 81	Divisional Court	
1918	The King v London County Council, Ex parte Corrie	[1918] 1 KB 68	Divisional Court	
1918	Davis v Curry	[1918] 1 KB 109	Divisional Court	
1918	The King v The Justices of Carnarvonshire. Ex parte The County Council of Carnarvon	[1918] 1 KB 280	Divisional Court	
1918	In re The Plymouth Breweries, Limited (In re The "Prince Arthur" Public-House, Plymouth)	[1918] 1 KB 573	King's Bench Division	
1918	Copartnership Farms v Harvey-Smith	[1918] 2 KB 405	King's Bench Division	
1918	Henman v Berliner	[1918] 2 KB 236	King's Bench Division	
1918	Hulme v Ferranti, Limited	[1918] 2 KB 236	Divisional Court	
1918	Grays Urban District Council v Grays Chemical Works, Limited	[1918] 2 KB 461	King's Bench Division	
1918	Commissioners of Inland Revenue v North and Ingram	[1918] 2 KB 705	King's Bench Division	
1918	Williamson film Printing Company, Limited v Commissioners of Inland Revenue	[1918] 2 KB 720	King's Bench Division	
1918	Samuel v. Commissioners of Inland Revenue	[1918] 2 KB 553	King's Bench Division	
1918	Singer v Williams (Surveyor of Taxes)	[1918] 2 KB 432	King's Bench Division	
1918	Commissioners of Inland Revenue v Duke Of Northumberland	[1918] 2 KB 573	King's Bench Division	
1918	Weiss, Biheller & Brooks, Limited v Farmer (Surveyor of Taxes)	[1918] 2 KB 725	King's Bench Division	
1918	Earl of Ellesmere v Commissioners of Inland Revenue	[1918	2 KB 735	King's Bench Division
1918	Williams v Singer and Others	[1918] 2 KB 749	King's Bench Division	
1918	Earl Howe v Commissioners of Inland Revenue	[1918] 2 KB 584	King's Bench Division	
1919	Holman & Sons, Limited, for Owner of the S.S. Nefeli v Merchant's Marine Insurance Company, Limited	[1919] 1 KB 383	King's Bench Division	
1919	Trustee of Denny v Denny and Warr	[1919] 1 KB 583	King's Bench Division	
1919	Burt & Company v Commissioners of Inland Revenue	[1919] 2 KB 650	Court of Appeal	
1919	Jenkyns v Southampton, Etc., Steam Packet Company, Limited	[1919] 2 KB 135	King's Bench Division and Court of Appeal	
1916-1917	R v Sheffield Justices Ex parte Morrison	[1916-1917] All ER Rep 1107; [1916-17] All ER Rep 1107	King's Bench Division	
1916-1917	Mattison v Johnson	[1916-1917] All ER Rep 727; [1916-17] All ER Rep 727	King's Bench Division	
1916-1917	Norman v Mathews and Another	[1916-1917] All ER Rep 696; [1916-17] All ER Rep 696	King's Bench Division	
1916-1917	Municipal Mutual Insurance, Ltd v Pontefract Corporation	[1916-1917] All ER Rep 543; [1916-17] All ER Rep 543	King's Bench Division	
1918	T. Benyon and Co., Limited v Ogg (Surveyor of Taxes)	7 TC 125	King's Bench Division	
1919	The Right Honourable Richard George Penn Curzon-Howe (Earl Howe) v The Commissioners of Inland Revenue	[1919] 2 KB 336	King's Bench Division	

== 1920-1922 ==
Year	Case Name	Citation	Court
1920	Welton v Ruffles	[1920] 1 KB 226	Divisional Court
1920	The King v Farnborough Urban District Council. Ex parte The Aldershot District Traction Company	[1920] 1 KB 234	Divisional Court
1920	Mittelmann and Another v Denman	[1920] 1 KB 519	Divisional Court
1920	Indian and General Investment Trust, Limited v Borax Consolidated, Limited	[1920] 1 KB 539	King's Bench Division
1920	Gladstone v Burton	[1920] 1 KB 608	Divisional Court
1920	Attorney-General v Brown	[1920] 1 KB 773	King's Bench Division
1920	Burchell v Thompson, John E. Harrison Limited	[1920] 2 KB 80	Divisional Court and Court of Appeal
1920	Mayo v Joyce	[1920] 1 KB 824	Divisional Court
1920	Chester v Bateson	[1920] 1 KB 829	Divisional Court
1920	Attwood v Lamont	[1920] 2 KB 146	Divisional Court
1920	Hartell v Blackler	[1920] 2 KB 61	Divisional Court
1920	Rex v Bedfordshire County Council, Ex parte Sear	[1920] 2 KB 465	Divisional Court
1920	Harrop v Harrop	[1920] 3 KB 386	King's Bench Division
1920	Adams v London Improved Motor Coach Builders, Limited	[1920] 3 KB 82	King's Bench Division
1920	The King v Tribunal of Appeal Under the Housing Act, 1919	[1920] 3 KB 334	Divisional Court
1920	Rex v Dickinson	[1920] 3 KB 552	Divisional Court
1920	Gibaud v Great Eastern Railway Company	[1920] 3 KB 689	Divisional Court
1921	Dey v Pullinger Engineering Company	[1921] 1 KB 77	Divisional Court
1921	Mayo v Stazicker	[1921] 2 KB 196	Divisional Court
1921	Llangollen Parish Council and Overseers and Others	[1921] 3 KB 313	King's Bench Division
1921	Chellew v Royal Commission on the Sugar Supply	[1921] 2 KB 627	King's Bench Division
1921	The King v Graham Campbell, Ex parte Ahmed Hamid Moussa	[1921] 2 KB 473	Divisional Court
1921	French and Another v Gething	[1921] 3 KB 280	Divisional Court
1921	National Cash Register Company, Limited v Stanley	[1921] 3 KB 292	Divisional Court
1921	Attorney-General v Coole and Others	[1921] 3 KB 607	King's Bench Division
1921	Ellis v Dubowski	[1921] 3 KB 621	Divisional Court
1921	Few and Another v Robinson	[1921] 3 KB 504	Divisional Court
1922	Margerison v E. Hind and Company, Limited	[1922] 1 KB 214	Divisional Court
1922	Keane v Ashbocking Overseers	[1922] 1 KB 143	Divisional Court
1922	Boyce v Cox	[1922] 1 KB 149	Divisional Court
1922	Dickinson v Bainbridge	[1922] 1 KB 423	Divisional Court
1922	Stirk and Sons, Limited v Halifax Assessment Committee	[1922] 1 KB 264	Divisional Court
1922	Ryall v Cubitt Heath	[1922] 1 KB 275	Divisional Court
1922	The King v Mayor & C., Of Cambridge. Ex parte Cambridge Picture Playhouses, Limited	[1922] 1 KB 250	Divisional Court
1922	Hackney Borough Council v. Dor	[1922] 1 KB 431	Divisional Court
1922	Smith v Williams	[1922] 1 KB 158	King's Bench Division
1922	Governors of Sutton's Hospital in Charterhouse v Elliott (Inspector of Taxes)	[1922] 2 KB 1	King's Bench Division
1922	Pool v The Guardian Investment Trust Company Limited	[1922] 1 KB 347	King's Bench Division
1922	The King v Latchingdon Overseers. Ex parte Hearn and Another	[1922] 2 KB 14	Divisional Court
1922	E.H. Bruce (Surveyor of Taxes) v J.L.S. Hatton n(1)	[1922] 2 KB 206	King's Bench Division
1922	Attorney-General v Burns and Others	[1922] 1 KB 491	King's Bench Division
1922	Attorney-General v Earl of Sandwich	[1922] 2 KB 500	King's Bench Division and Court of Appeal
1922	Baker and Another v inland Revenue Commissioners	[1922] 2 KB 786	King's Bench Division
1922	Attorney-General v Astor and Others	[1922] 2 KB 651	King's Bench Division
1922	Davis v Commissioners of Inland Revenue	[1922] 2 KB 805	King's Bench Division
1920	Woodward v Samuels	[1920] All ER Rep 659, Also reported 89 LJKB 689; 122 LT 681; 84 JP 105	King's Bench Division
1920	Dey v Pullinger Engineering Co		
1921	R v Campbell, ex parte Moussa	[1921] All ER Rep 499, Also reported [1921] 2 KB 473; 90 LJKB 818; 125 LT 310; 85 JP 189; 37 TLR 611; 19 LGR 461; 26 Cox CC 747	King's Bench Division
1921	Ellis v Dubowski and another	[1921] All ER Rep 272, Also reported [1921] 3 KB 621; 91 LJKB 89; 126 LT 91; 85 JP 230; 37 TLR 910; 19 LGR 641; 27 Cox CC 107	King's Bench Division
1921	Smith v Williams	[1921] All ER Rep Ext 749, Also reported: [1922] 1 KB 158; 91 LJKB 156; 126 LT 410; 38 TLR 116; 8 TC 321	King's Bench Division
1921	Bourne & Hollingsworth v The Commissioners of Inland Revenue	12 TC 483	King's Bench Division
1921	The Lincoln Wagon and Engine Co., Ltd. v The Commissioners of Inland Revenue	12 TC 494	King's Bench Division
1921	The Commissioners of Inland Revenue v The Budderpore Oil Co., Ltd.	12 TC 467	King's Bench Division
1921	Pool v Guardian Investment Trust Company Limited	[1921] All ER Rep Ext 785; Also reported: [1922] 1 KB 347; 91 LJKB 242; 126 LT 540; 38 TLR 177; 8 Tax Cas 167]	King's Bench Division
1921	A.F. Pool (Inspector of Taxes) v The Guardian Investment Trust Co., Ltd.	[1922] 1 KB 347, 126 LT 540, 38 TLR 177, 8 TC 167	King's Bench Division
1922	W. Friedson (H.M. Inspector of Taxes) v the Rev F.H. Glyn-Thomas	8 TC 302, [1922] 128 LT 24, [1922] WN 251	King's Bench Division
1922	Nevile Reid & Co., Ltd. v The Commissioners of Inland Revenue	12 TC 545	King's Bench Division
1922	S.W. Hawker v J. Compton (H.M. Inspector of Taxes)	8 TC 306	King's Bench Division
1922	H.C.H. Barton (H.M. Inspector of Taxes) v C.D. Miller	8 TC 315	King's Bench Division
1922	R v Godfrey	[1922] All ER Rep 266; Also reported [1923] 1 KB 24; 92 LJKB 205; 128 LT 115; 86 JP 219; 39 TLR 5; 67 Sol Jo 147; 27 Cox CC 338	King's Bench Division

== 1923-1925 ==
Year	Case Name	Citation	Court
1923	The King v Godfrey	[1923] 1 KB 24	Divisional Court
1923	Parochial Church Council of St. Magnus-The-Martyr, with St. Maragret, New Fish Street, and St. Michael, Crooked Lane London v Chancellor of the Diocese of London and Others	[1923] P 38	King's Bench Division
1923	Metropolitan Water Board v Assessment Committee of the Metropolitan Borough of St. Marylebone	[1923] 1 KB 86	Divisional Court
1923	Chard v Bush	[1923] 2 KB 849	Divisional Court
1923	The King v Hammer	[1923] 2 KB 786	Court of Criminal Appeal
1923	The King v Kakelo	[1923] 2 KB 793	Court of Criminal Appeal
1923	Keeves v Dean, Nunn v Pellegrini	[1923] 2 KB 804	Divisional Court
1924	Griffiths v Studebakers, Limited	[1924] 1 KB 102	Divisional Court
1924	Sandeman v Gold	[1924] 1 KB 107	Divisional Court
1924	The King v Recorder of Kingston-Upon-Hull. Ex parte Guardians of Kinston-upon-Hull (de Hart). Same v Same. Ex parte Same. The King v Recorder of Kingston-Upon-Hull. Ex parte Guardians of Kingston-Upon-Hull (de Matchan). Same v Same. Ex parte Same	[1924] 1 KB 630	Divisional Court
1924	Mayor, Etc., of chester v Briggs	[1924] 1 KB 239	Divisional Court
1924	London County Council v. Lord Mayor, Etc., of Birmingham	[1924] 1 KB 248	Divisional Court
1924	Commissioners of customs and Excise v Griffith	[1924] 1 KB 163	Divisional Court
1924	The King v Roberts. Ex parte Scurr and Others	[1924] 1 KB 514	Divisional Court
1924	Pulling v Lidbetter, Limited	[1924] 1 KB 317	Divisional Court
1924	The King v Governor of Brixton Prison. Ex parte Perry	[1924] 1 KB 455	Divisional Court
1924	Bourgeois v Weddell and Company	[1924] 1 KB 539	Divisional Court
1924	Landrigan v Simons	[1924] 1 KB 509	Divisional Court
1924	Jay and Another v Jay and Another	[1924] 1 KB 826	Divisional Court
1924	Dufty v Palmer	[1924] 2 KB 35	Divisional Court
1924	Butwick v Grant	[1924] 2 KB 483	Divisional Court
1924	Precious v Reedie	[1924] 2 KB 149	Divisional Court
1923	Morden Rigg and Co. and R. B. Eskrigge and Co. v Monks (Surveyor of Taxes)	8 TC 450	King's Bench Division
1923	The Commissioners of Inland Revenue v The Gas Lighting Improvement Co., Ltd.	[1923] AC 723, 12 TC 503, 39 TLR 504 (1923) 129 LT 481 [1922] 2 KB 381	King's Bench Division, Court of Appeal, House of Lords
1923	Bradbury (H.M. Inspector of Taxes) v The English Sewing Cotton Company, Limited	[1923] AC 744, [1923] All ER Rep 427, 129 LT 546, 39 TLR 590. [1922] 2 KB 569, 8 TC 481	King's Bench Division; Court of Appeal; House of Lords
1923	R v Kakelo	[1923] All ER Rep 191, Also reported [1923] 2 KB 793; 92 LJKB 997; 129 LT 477; 87 JP 184; 39 TLR 671; 68 Sol Jo 41; 27 Cox CC 454; 17 Cr App Rep 150	Court of Criminal Appeal
1924	Butwick v Grant	[1924] All ER Rep 274, Also reported [1924] 2 KB 483; 93 LJKB 972; 131 LT 476	King's Bench Division
1925	Buckle v Holmes	[1925] All ER Rep 676, Also reported [1926] 2 KB 125; 95 LJKB 547; 134 LT 743; 90 JP 109; 42 TLR 369; 70 Sol Jo 464	King's Bench Division
1925	Nicholson v England	[1925] All ER Rep 335, Also reported [1926] 2 KB 93; 95 LJKB 505; 134 LT 702	King's Bench Division

== 1926-1928 ==
Year	Case Name	Citation	Court
1926	Turner v Civil Service Supply Association, Limited	[1926] 1 KB 50	King's Bench Division
1925	Con, Planck, Limited v Kolynos, Incorporated	[1925] 2 KB 804	King's Bench Division
1925	Laurie and Morewood v John Dudin and Sons	[1925] 2 KB 383	King's Bench Division
1926	Rush v Matthews	[1926] 1 KB 75	Divisional Court
1926	The King v Hertfordshire Justices. Ex parte Larsen	[1926] 1 KB 191	Divisional Court
1926	Atkinson v London and North Eastern Railway Company	[1926] 1 KB 313	Divisional Court
1926	clayton and Others v Sale Urban District Council	[1926] 1 KB 415	Divisional Court
1926	Morgan v Evans	[1926] 2 KB 74	Divisional Court
1926	Guardians of the Poor of Barton-Upon-Irwell Union, Appellants v Guardians of the Poor of Wycombe Union, Respondents. n(1)	[1926] 1 KB 212	Divisional Court
1926	Williams v Stanley Jones and Company, Limited	[1926] 1 KB 255	Divisional Court
1926	Frederick Braby and Company, Limited v Bedwell	[1926] 1 KB 456	Divisional Court
1926	Standingford v Bruce	[1926] 1 KB 466	Divisional Court
1926	Nicholson v England	[1926] 2 KB 93	Divisional Court
1926	Daventry Corporation v Newbury and Wright	[1926] 1 KB 383	Divisional Court
1926	Field v Curnick and Others	[1926] 2 KB 374	King's Bench Division
1927	British and North European Bank, Limited v Zalzstein	[1927] 2 KB 92	King's Bench Division
1927	Wisbech Rural District Council v Ward	[1927] 2 KB 556	King's Bench Division
1927	Arnold and Weaver v Amari	[1928] 1 KB 584	King's Bench Division
1928	Brookes and Others v Liffen	[1928] 2 KB 347	Court of Appeal
1928	Dee Conservancy Board and Others v McConnell and Another	[1928] 2 KB 159	Court of Appeal
1928	Gardiner v Heading and Another	[1928] 2 KB 284	Court of Appeal
1928	France v J. Coombes and Company	[1928] 2 KB 81	Court of Appeal
1928	Reckitt v Barnett, Pembroke and Slater, Limited	[1928] 2 KB 244	Court of Appeal
1928	Conquer v Boot	[1928] 2 KB 336	Divisional Court
1928	Stott and Another v Shaw and Lee, Limited	[1928] 2 KB 26	King's Bench Division and Court of Appeal
1928	Aktieselskabet Ocean v B. Harding and Sons, Limited, and Others	[1928] 2 KB 371	Court of Appeal
1928	English Hop Growers, Limited v Dering	[1928] 2 KB 174	Court of Appeal
1928	Hardie and Lane, Limited v Chilton and Others	[1928] 2 KB 306	Court of Appeal
1928	Dee Conservancy Board and others v McConnell and Another	[1928] All ER Rep 554, Also reported [1928] 2 KB 159; 97 LJKB 487; 138 LT 656; 92 JP 54; 26 LGR 204; 17 Asp MLC 433	Court of Appeal
1928	Merchants' Marine Insurance Co, Ltd v Liverpool Marine and General Insurance Co, Ltd	[1928] All ER Rep 452, Also reported 97 LJKB 589; 139 LT 184; 44 TLR 512; 17 Asp MLC 475; 33 Com Cas 294	Court of Appeal
1928	Symington & Co v Union Insurance Society of Canton, Ltd	[1928] All ER Rep 346, Also reported 97 LJKB 646; 139 LT 386; 4 TLR 635; 18 Asp MLC 19; 34 Com Cas 23	Court of Appeal
1928	Howson v Buxton	[1928] All ER Rep 434, Also reported 97 LJKB 749; 139 LT 504	Court of Appeal
1928	J Aron & Co v Miall and others	[1928] All ER Rep 655, Also reported 98 LJKB 204, 139 LT 562, 34 Com Cas 18, 17 Asp MLC 529	Court of Appeal
1928	Lloyd v Cook, Goudge v Broughton, Simson v Miatt, Bartram v Brown, Barker v Hutson	[1928] All ER Rep 201, Also reported 1929 1 KB 103; 97 LJKB 657; 139 LT 452; 92 JP 199; 44 TLR 761; 72 Sol Jo 533; 26 LGR 609	Court of Appeal
1928	Lind v Mitchell	[1928] All ER Rep 447, Also reported 98 LJKB 120; 140 LT 261; 17 Asp MLC 562; 34 Com Cas 81; 45 TLR 54	Court of Appeal
1928	James Finlay & Co, Ltd v NV Kwik Hoo Tong Handel Maatschappij	[1928] All ER Rep 110, Also reported [1929] 1 KB 400; 98 LJKB 251; 140 LT 389; 45 TLR 149; 34 Com Cas 143; 17 Asp MLC 566	Court of Appeal

== 1929-1930 ==
Year	Case Name	Citation	Court
1929	Lloyds Bank, Limited v The Chartered Bank of India, Australia and China	[1929] 1 KB 40	Court of Appeal
1928	Edward Curran and Company, Limited v Kays	[1928] 2 KB 469	Court of Appeal
1929	William Bean and Sons v Flaxton Rural District Council	[1929] 1 KB 450	King's Bench Division and Court of Appeal
1929	Smith, Hogg and Company, Limited v Louis Bamberger and Sons	[1929] 1 KB 150	King's Bench Division and Court of Appeal
1929	Hyman v Hyman, Hughes v Hughes	[1929] P 1	Probate, Divorce and Admiralty Division and Court of Appeal
1929	Elwell v Crane Foundry Company, Limited	[1929] 1 KB 88	Court of Appeal
1929	Smith v Wood	[1929] 1 Ch 14	Court of Appeal
1929	Wood v Petre	[1929] 1 Ch 33	Court of Appeal
1929	Lloyd v Cook. Goudge v Broughton. Siman v Miatt. Bartram v Brown and Others. Barker v Hutson	[1929] 1 KB 103	Court of Appeal
1929	Tilling-Stevens Motors, Limited v Kent county Council and Minister of Transport	[1929] 1 Ch 66	Court of Appeal
1929	Fleetwood-Hesketh v Fleetwood-Hesketh	[1929] 2 KB 55	Court of Appeal
1929	Lawrence v George Matthews (1924), Limited	[1929] 1 KB 1	Court of Appeal
1929	Burton v Board	[1929] 1 KB 301	Court of Appeal
1929	The King v County of Southampton Confirming Committee. Ex parte Slade	[1929] 1 KB 263	King's Bench Division and Court of Appeal
1929	G. Scammell and Nephew, Limited v Hurley and Others	[1929] 1 KB 419	Court of Appeal
1929	Hoskins-Abrahall v Paignton Urban District Council	[1929] 1 Ch 375	Court of Appeal
1929	Foster v Driscoll and Others. Lindsay v Attfield and Another. Lindsay v Driscoll and Others	[1929] 1 KB 470	Court of Appeal
1929	Farnworth v Lord mayor, Aldermen and Citizens of the City of Manchester	[1929] 1 KB 533	Court of Appeal
1929	James Finlay and Company, Limited v N. v Kwik Hoo Tong Handel Maatschappij	[1929] 1 KB 400	Court of Appeal
1929	The Bournemouth-Swanage Motor Road and Ferry Company v Harvey and Sons	[1929] 1 Ch 686	Court of Appeal
1929	Watts v Mayor, Aldermen and Councillors of the Metropolitan Borough of Battersea	[1929] 2 KB 63	Court of Appeal
1929	Hobbs v Tinling (C.T.) and Company, Limited. Hobbs v Nottingham Journal, Limited.	[1929] 2 KB 1	Court of Appeal
1929	The Young Sid	[1929] P 190	Court of Appeal
1929	John Lovibond and Sons, Limited v Vincent	[1929] 1 KB 687	Court of Appeal
1929	Aldridge v Wright	[1929] 1 KB 117	Divisional Court
1929	Princess Paley Olga v weisz and Others	[1929] 1 KB 718	Court of Appeal
1929	Midland Motor Showrooms, Limited v Newman	[1929] 2 KB 256	Court of Appeal
1929	Birmingham Corporation v Inland Revenue Commissioners	[1929] 2 KB 187	Court of Appeal
1930	Thompson v London, Midland and Scottish Railway Company	[1930] 1 KB 41	Court of Appeal
1930	Commissioners of Inland Revenue v Dalgety and Company, Limited	[1930] 1 KB 1	King's Bench Division and Court of Appeal
1929	Attorney-General v Quixley	[1929] All ER Rep 696, Also reported King's Bench Division: 98 LJKB 315; 141 LT 288; 45 TLR 191	King's Bench Division and Court of Appeal
1929	Horwood v Statesman Publishing Co, Ltd and Others; Childs v Same	[1929] All ER Rep 554, Also reported 98 LJKB 450; 141 LT 54; 45 TLR 237	Court of Appeal
1929	Compania Mexicana de Petroleo "El Aguila" v Essex Transport Trading Co, Ltd	[1929] All ER Rep 589, Also reported 141 LT 106; 34 Com Cas 198; 17 Asp MLC 590	Court of Appeal
1929	Burrowes v Burrowes	[1929] All ER Rep 374, Also reported: 141 LT 201; 45 TLR 401	Court of Appeal
1929	Leitch v Emmott (Inspector of Taxes)	[1929] All ER Rep 638, Also reported [1929] 2 KB 236; 98 LJKB 673; 141 LT 311; 14 TC 633	Court of Appeal

== See also ==
- John Sankey, 1st Viscount Sankey
- Lord Sankey's JCPC judgments
- List of Judicial Committee of the Privy Council cases
- List of Judicial Committee of the Privy Council cases originating in Canada
