= John Sankey, 1st Viscount Sankey =

British lawyer, judge, politician and Lord High Chancellor of Great Britain

The Right Honourable The Viscount Sankey GBE PC
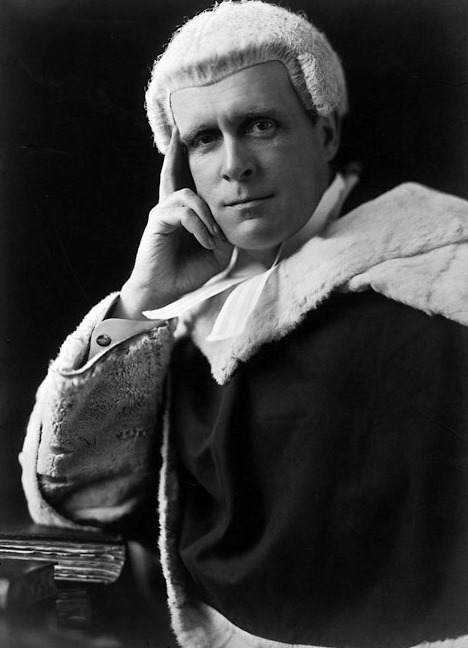

Lord Chancellor
- In office 7 June 1929 – 7 June 1935
- Monarch: George V
- Prime Minister: Ramsay MacDonald
- Preceded by: The Viscount Hailsham
- Succeeded by: The Viscount Hailsham

Personal details
- Born: John Sankey; 26 October 1866 Moreton-in-Marsh, England
- Died: 6 February 1948 (aged 81) London, England
- Party: Labour
- Education: Jesus College, Oxford

John Sankey, 1st Viscount Sankey (26 October 1866 – 6 February 1948) was a British lawyer, judge, Labour politician and Lord High Chancellor of Great Britain, famous for many of his judgments in the House of Lords. He gave his name to the Sankey Declaration of the Rights of Man (1940).

== Background and education ==
He was the son of Thomas Sankey, a grocer of Moreton-in-Marsh, Gloucestershire, by his second wife Catalina (née Dewsbury). Sankey's father died when he was 8 years old, when the family moved to Castle Road (now City Road) in Roath, Cardiff. Sankey was educated at a local Anglican school, and with the financial support of an Anglican clergyman he attended Lancing College, a public school in Sussex. He studied at Jesus College, Oxford, graduating with a second-class BA in Modern History in 1889, and a third-class Bachelor of Civil Law degree in 1891. He was called to the Bar at Middle Temple in 1892.

== Political and legal career ==
Sankey began his practice as a barrister in south Wales, later specialising in workmen's compensation cases. In 1909 he was appointed a King's Counsel.

Sankey became a judge of the High Court, King's Bench Division, in 1914. In 1919, Prime Minister David Lloyd George appointed him to chair the Sankey Commission into the coal industry, which recommended a seven-hour day for miners and the nationalisation of the industry. He was appointed a Lord Justice of Appeal in 1928.

On Labour's victory in the 1929 general election, Sankey was appointed Lord Chancellor by Ramsay MacDonald, and was raised to the peerage as Baron Sankey, of Moreton in the County of Gloucester. He was one of the few Labour politicians to follow MacDonald into the National Government in 1931, and served as Lord Chancellor until 1935, when Stanley Baldwin re-entered office. In 1932 he was created Viscount Sankey, of Moreton in the County of Gloucester.

Several of his judgments in the House of Lords have become landmark statements of law. Sankey's judgment in Woolmington v DPP [1935] AC 462 is famous for iterating the duty inherent on the prosecution to prove the prisoner's guilt beyond a reasonable doubt. In pertinent part, his judgment stated:

Throughout the web of the English criminal law one golden thread is always to be seen – that it is the duty of the prosecution to prove the prisoner's guilt subject to what I have already said as to the defence of insanity and subject also to any statutory exception...

This judgment is usually referred to as the "golden thread".

Sitting in the Judicial Committee of the Privy Council, Lord Sankey gave decisions in significant Canadian constitutional law cases. Of particular note is Edwards v. Canada (Attorney General) (often referred to as the Persons Case). In his decision, Sankey affirmed that women are eligible to be appointed to the Senate of Canada. In his analysis, he set out the living tree doctrine of constitutional interpretation that has become a foundation of Canadian constitutional law. In another significant decision, the Aeronautics Reference, Sankey held that the federal government had exclusive regulatory jurisdiction over aeronautics.

== Sankey Declaration ==
Sankey's name was associated with the Sankey Declaration of the Rights of Man, the product of the Sankey Committee, which was set up in 1940 by the Daily Herald and the National Peace Council, and which Sankey chaired. The most active member of the committee was H. G. Wells, who prepared the draft that the Declaration was based on. It identified eleven fundamental human rights:

- right to life
- protection of minors
- duty to the community
- right to knowledge
- freedom of thought and worship
- right to work
- right to personal property
- freedom of movement
- personal liberty
- freedom from violence
- right of law-making.

The Sankey Declaration was widely publicised by its sponsors at the time, but has since been largely forgotten, having been overtaken by the Universal Declaration of Human Rights.

Sankey played a key role in establishing the legal framework of the newly disestablished Church in Wales.

== Personal life ==
Sankey never married. He died in London on 6 February 1948, aged 81, when the peerage became extinct. He is buried in The Lower Cemetery of Moreton in Marsh, Gloucestershire. A house at his former school Lancing College is named after him. Sankey endowed a scholarship for students at Jesus College Oxford seeking to practise at the English Bar.

== Arms ==
Coat of arms of John Sankey, 1st Viscount Sankey
Crest In front of a dexter cubit arm vested Gules cuffed Ermine the hand grasping by the beam a pair of scales Proper a martlet as in the arms. Escutcheon Gules a fess Ermine between in chief two martlets and in base a salmon Or. Supporters On either side a lion Sable gorged with a collar Or suspended therefrom on the dexter an escutcheon Azure charged with a Paschal lamb Gold and on the sinister an escutcheon Vert charged with a stag trippant also Gold. Other elements Circlet and collar of a Knight Grand Cross of the Order of the British Empire

== See also ==
- Coal Industry Commission Act 1919
- Lord Sankey's lower court judgments
- Lord Sankey's JCPC judgments
- List of Judicial Committee of the Privy Council cases
- List of Judicial Committee of the Privy Council cases originating in Canada

Political offices
Preceded by The Viscount Hailsham	Lord High Chancellor of Great Britain; 1929–1935	Succeeded by The Viscount Hailsham
Peerage of the United Kingdom
New creation	Viscount Sankey; 1932–1948	Extinct
New creation	Baron Sankey; 1929–1948	Extinct
