= Robert Kindersley, 1st Baron Kindersley =

English businessman, stockbroker, merchant banker, and public servant (1871-1954)

The Right Honourable The Lord Kindersley GBE
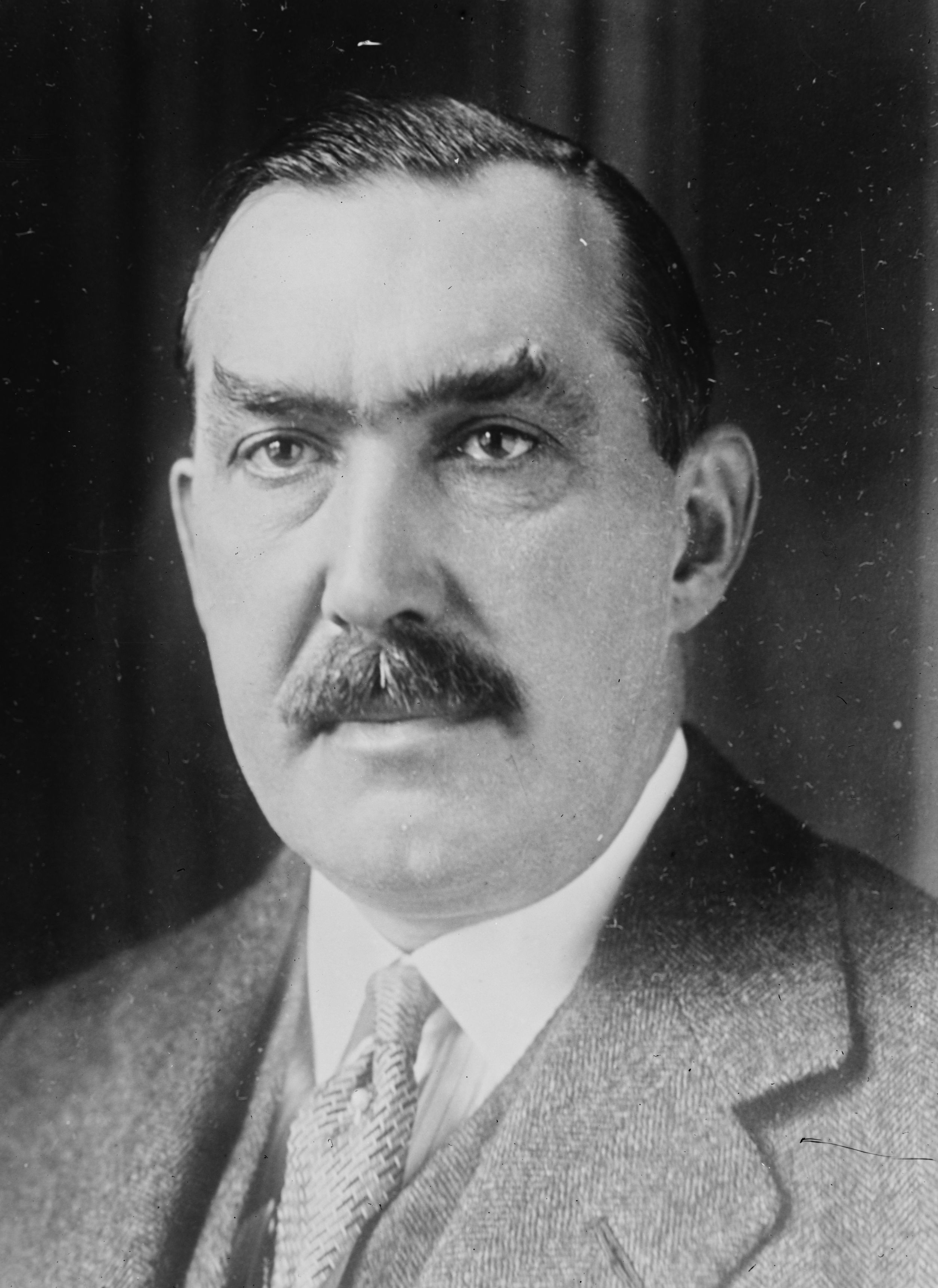
- Sir Robert Kindersley, 1924
- Born: Robert Molesworth Kindersley; 21 November 1871; Wanstead, UK
- Died: 20 July 1954 (aged 82)
- Education: Repton School
- Occupation: Banker
- Known for: Chairman of the National Savings Committee
- Spouse: Gladys Margaret Beadle (m. 1896)
- Children: 6
- Relatives: Hugh Kindersley (son); Guy Kindersley (brother); Gay Kindersley (grandson); Nathaniel Edward Kindersley (great-grandfather); James Prinsep Beadle (brother-in-law)

Robert Molesworth Kindersley, 1st Baron Kindersley (21 November 1871 – 20 July 1954) was an English businessman, stockbroker, merchant banker, and public servant who organised the National Savings Movement.

== Background ==
Kindersley was born in Wanstead, Essex, the son of Edward Nassau Molesworth Kindersley, of Sherborne, Dorset, and Ada Good, daughter of John Murray. His father was an Old Etonian and Oxford graduate from a wealthy family who had been a captain in the Green Howards and the Indian Army, but had fallen on hard times since resigning his commission and becoming a chemist, working for Scott & Co. Chemical Works at Bow, London; he was also a director of the Anglo American Leather Cloth Company. Kindersley was educated at Repton School but was forced to leave in 1887 when his father could no longer afford the fees. Kindersley was the great-grandson of the civil servant and translator Nathaniel Edward Kindersley, whose mother, Jemima Kindersley (née Wickstead), was a travel writer.

== Banking career ==
He then became a clerk in several London firms before joining the London Stock Exchange in 1901, becoming a partner in David A. Bevan & Co. in 1902 and the merchant bank Lazard Brothers & Co. in 1905, a firm with which he was connected for the rest of his life and of which he became chairman in 1919.

== Public service ==
From 1915 to 1925, Kindersley was Governor (Company Chairman) of the Hudson's Bay Company, North America's oldest company (established by an English royal charter in 1670). He served as a director of the Bank of England from 1914 to 1946. In 1924, he was the senior British representative on the Dawes Committee.

Kindersley is chiefly recognised for his work as chairman of the National Savings Committee from 1916 to 1920; he was then its president until 1946.

He was also a major shareholder in the Canadian Northern Railway, later amalgamated into Canadian National Railways, and the town of Kindersley, Saskatchewan, was named after him. Mount Kindersley in British Columbia was named in his honor in 1924.

== Personal life ==
He married Gladys Margaret Beadle, sister of the military artist James Prinsep Beadle, of Worton Grange, Wiltshire, on 3 November 1896 and had six children; Lionel, Hugh, Margaret, Richard, Philip (who married Oonagh Guinness and Valerie Violet French) and Elizabeth. Lord Kindersley was succeeded in the Barony by his second son Hugh, his eldest son Lionel having been killed in action in the First World War.

== Honours and arms ==
Kindersley was knighted as Knight Commander of the Order of the British Empire (KBE) in 1917 and raised to Knight Grand Cross (GBE) in the 1920 civilian war honours for his chairmanship of the National Savings Committee. He served as High Sheriff of Sussex for 1928 and, in 1941, was raised to the peerage as Baron Kindersley, of West Hoathly in the County of West Sussex.

Coat of arms of Robert Kindersley, 1st Baron Kindersley
Crest Upon a mount Vert in front of a hawthorn tree Proper charged with an escutcheon Azure thereon a lion rampant Argent a greyhound sejant also Argent. Escutcheon Per bend Gules and Azure a lion rampant Argent within an orle of cross-crosslets and fleur-de-lys alternatively Or. Supporters On the dexter side a greyhound Argent gorged with a collar Azure charged with three cross-crosslets Or and on the sinister side a lion Argent gorged with a collar Gules charged as the dexter each standing upon a branch of hawthorn Proper. Motto Adjuvante Deo (Latin for 'God helping') Orders Knight Grand Cross of the Order of the British Empire

Peerage of the United Kingdom
New creation	Baron Kindersley; 1941–1954	Succeeded by Hugh Kindersley
