= Charles Kindersley =

English cricketer and British Army officer

Personal information
- Full name: Charles Hamilton Leigh Kindersley
- Born: 23 August 1893; Ferozepore, Punjab, British India
- Died: 8 August 1958 (aged 64); Tenterden, Kent, England
- Batting: Unknown
- Role: Wicket-keeper

Domestic team information
- Years: Team
- 1911–1912: Dorset
- 1927/28: Europeans (India)
- 1934/35: Northern India

Career statistics
Competition	First-class
Matches	3
Runs scored	33
Batting average	8.25
100s/50s	–/–
Top score	14
Balls bowled	–
Wickets	–
Bowling average	–
5 wickets in innings	–
10 wickets in match	–
Best bowling	–
Catches/stumpings	2/1
- Source: ESPNcricinfo, 2 October 2018

Charles Hamilton Leigh Kindersley (23 August 1893 – 8 August 1958) was an English first-class cricketer and British Army officer.

The son of Maitland Fitzroy Kindersley (and great-grandson of Richard Torin Kindersley), he was born at Ferozepore in British India. He was educated in England at Harrow School. He played minor counties cricket for Dorset in 1911 and 1912, making ten appearances in the Minor Counties Championship. Kindsersley served in the British Army during World War I, entering with the rank of second lieutenant. By June 1917, he held the rank of temporary captain in the Dorset Regiment. After the war, Kindersley was seconded to the Royal Hampshire Regiment in 1919.

He later transferred to the British Indian Army, where he served with the permanent rank of captain. While serving in India, he made his debut in first-class cricket for the Europeans against the Hindus at Lahore in March 1928. Days after the conclusion of this match, he played for the Punjab Governor's XI against Northern India. He made a third and final first-class appearance for Northern India against the Indian Army in the 1934–35 Ranji Trophy. He scored 33 runs across his three matches, with a top score of 14. He returned to England at some point after 1934, where he died at Tenterden, Kent, in August 1958, just shy of his 65th birthday.
