= Mount Kindersley =

Mountain in British Columbia, Canada

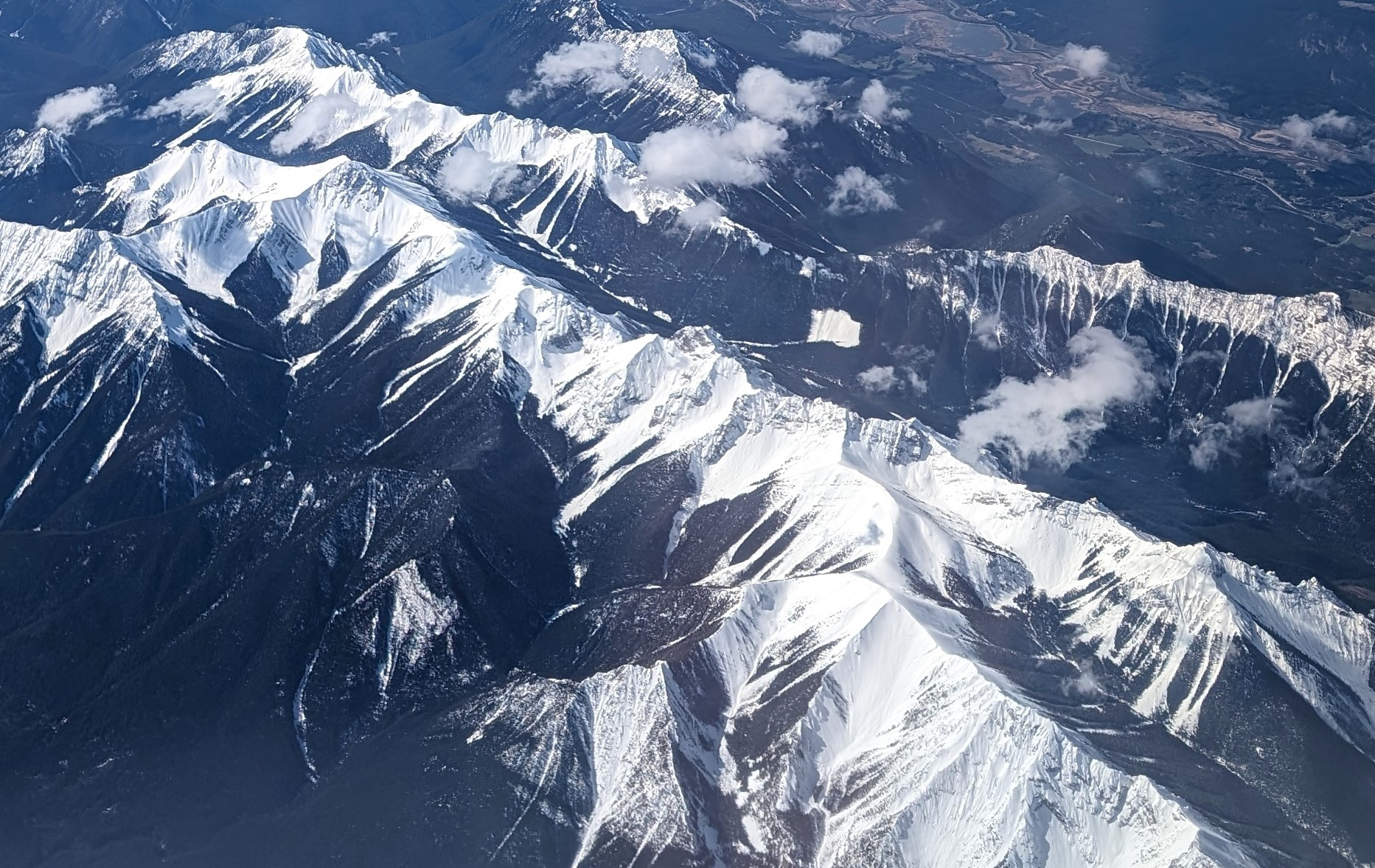
- Summit centered. North aspect, from airliner.

Highest point
- Elevation: 2,697 m (8,848 ft)
- Prominence: 818 m (2,684 ft)
- Isolation: 12.33 km (7.66 mi)
- Listing: Mountains of British Columbia
- Coordinates: 50°44′16″N 116°01′10″W

Naming
- Etymology: Sir Robert Kindersley

Geography
- Location within British Columbia Location within Canada
- Country: Canada
- Province: British Columbia
- District: Kootenay Land District
- Protected area: Kootenay National Park
- Parent range: Canadian Rockies; Kootenay Ranges; Brisco Range
- Topo map: NTS 82K9 Radium Hot Springs

Mount Kindersley is a 2,697-metre (8,848-foot) mountain in British Columbia, Canada.

== Description ==
Mount Kindersley is located 12 kilometres (7.5 mi) north of Radium Hot Springs in Kootenay National Park. The peak is the second-highest point of the Brisco Range which is a subrange of the Canadian Rockies. Precipitation runoff from this mountain's east slope drains to the Kootenay River via Nixon and Meadow creeks, whereas the west slope drains to the Columbia River via Kindersley Creek. Topographic relief is significant with the summit rising 1,100 metres (3,609 ft) above Kindersley Creek in 1.5 kilometres (0.93 mi). The mountain is named after Sir Robert Kindersley (1871–1954), who toured Canada in 1920. Kindersley was Governor (Company Chairman) of the Hudson's Bay Company from 1915 to 1925. The mountain's toponym was officially adopted September 9, 1924, by the Geographical Names Board of Canada.

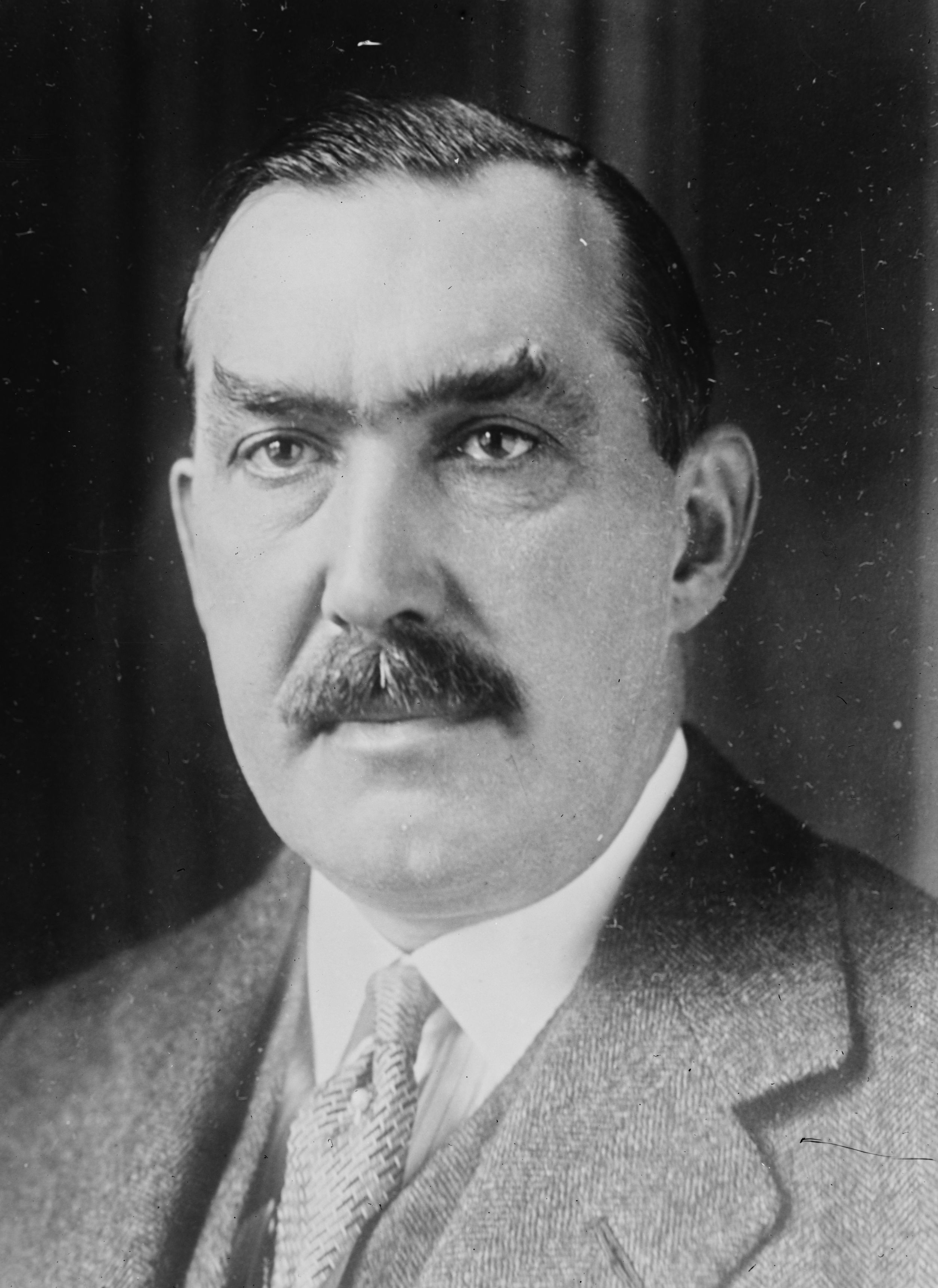
Kindersley

== Climate ==
Based on the Köppen climate classification, Mount Kindersley is located in a subarctic climate zone with cold, snowy winters, and mild summers. Winter temperatures can drop below −20 °C with wind chill factors below −30 °C.

== See also ==
- Geography of British Columbia
- Geology of British Columbia
