= List of Canadian appeals to the Judicial Committee of the Privy Council, 1867–1869 =

List of Canadian appeals to the JCPC (1867–1869)

This page lists all appeals the Judicial Committee of the Privy Council from the Canadian courts, decided in the years 1867 to 1869.

Prior to the creation of Canada in 1867, the Judicial Committee of the Privy Council was the highest court of appeal for the British North American provinces. That did not change after Confederation. Parties could continue to appeal to the Judicial Committee directly from the provincial appellate courts, as the Supreme Court of Canada was not created until 1875. Even then, there continued to be a right of appeal to the Judicial Committee. The decisions of the Judicial Committee on appeals from Canadian courts had binding legal precedent on all Canadian courts, including the Supreme Court, which was required to follow the cases of the Judicial Committee. The Judicial Committee decisions were the ultimate judicial authority for the Canadian courts and had a considerable influence on the development of Canadian law, particularly constitutional law.

== List of cases ==
Case name	Citation	Subject (Exact Text from Judgment)	Judges (Author of decision in bold)	Appeal Allowed or Dismissed	On Appeal From
Gugy v. Brown	[1867] UKPC 1, LR 1 PC 411	"This case is an Appeal from the Decree of the Court of Queen's Bench for Lower Canada, dated the 19th of December, 1862. By this Decree a Judgment dated the 2nd of November, 1861, of the Superior Court of the District of Quebec was reversed. That Judgment was pronounced by a single Judge (Taschereau) on a motion made by the present Appellant to review the Prothonotary's taxation of a bill of costs which had been submitted to him to be taxed by the Appellant, under a prior Judgment of the last-mentioned Court upon a proceeding called 'an opposition,' awarding him costs as against the Respondent generally by the words 'avec dépens.' The question, and the only question, raised and decided in the two Courts was, whether the Appellant, who was an advocate and attorney duly admitted therein, and had appeared personally in Court and conducted his own case as attorney on record, was entitled under the said Judgment to charge in his bill of costs, and to have allowed, on the taxation thereof against the Respondent, certain fees claimed and charged by him in respect of his character of attorney. Judge Taschereau decided in the affirmative; the Court of Queen's Bench in the negative."	Sir James W. Colvile; **Sir Edward Vaughan Williams**; Sir Richard Torin Kindersley	Appeal allowed	Quebec Court of Queen's Bench (Appeal Side)
Herrick v. Sixby	[1867] UKPC 15, LR 1 PC 436	"The action in which these Judgments were given was an action en bornage by the Appellant, to have the boundaries between two contiguous properties of the Appellant and the Respondent ascertained and determined."	Sir William Erle; Sir James W. Colvile; Sir Edward Vaughan Williams; **Sir Richard Torin Kindersley**	Appeal allowed	Quebec Court of Queen's Bench (Appeal Side)
The Bank of Upper Canada v. Bradshaw and others	[1867] UKPC 20, LR 1 PC 479	"This decision dealt with the scope of authority of the manager of the Bank; action by banking company against the late manager and cashier for negligence and misconduct in application of funds."	**Lord Cairns**; Lord Justice Turner; Sir Edward Vaughan Williams; Sir Richard Torin Kindersley	Appeal dismissed	Quebec Court of Queen's Bench (Appeal Side)
Scott v. Paquet	[1867] UKPC 26, LR 1 PC 552	"In an action brought by the Appellant against the Respondents, and in which the question to be determined was whether a marriage between William Henry Scott, Esq., deceased, and the Respondent, Marie Marguerite Maurice Paquet, on the 16th December, 1851, was valid or void."	Present at the First Argument: Lord Kingsdown; Sir Robert Phillimore, Judge of the Admiralty; Lord Chief Baron Pollock; Sir George Jessel, Master of the Rolls Present at the Second Argument: Sir John Coleridge; Sir James W. Colvile; Sir Edward Vaughan Williams; **Sir Fitz-Roy Kelly, The Lord Chief Baron**; Sir Richard Torin Kindersley	Appeal dismissed	Quebec Court of Queen's Bench (Appeal Side)
Macdonald v. Lambe	[1867] UKPC 30, LR 1 PC 539	"The actions in which these Appeals are brought were petitory actions to recover possession of two pieces of ground in the fifth range of Russeltown in the Seigniory of Beauharnois."	**Lord Cairns**; Lord Justice Turner; Sir Edward Vaughan Williams; Sir Richard Torin Kindersley	Appeal dismissed	Quebec Court of Queen's Bench (Appeal Side)
Renaud v. Tourangeau	(1867), LR 2 PC 4	"The Appellant was a judgment creditor of the Respondent. The appeal was brought to decide the right to certain lands and tenements in the possession of the Respondent which were taken in execution by the Sheriff of Quebec, under a writ of Fieri Facias issued upon the Appellant's judgment, under the following circumstances."	**Lord Romilly, Master of the Rolls**; Sir James W. Colvile; Sir Edward Vaughan Williams; Sir Richard Torin Kindersley	Appeal allowed	Quebec Court of Queen's Bench (Appeal Side)
Wallace v. McSweeney	[1868] UKPC 10, LR 2 PC 180	"In this case their Lordships are not called upon to pronounce any opinion upon the real merits of the cause. It appears that the Appellant and the Respondent, and another Gentleman, now deceased, were co-Executors and Trustees of a Roman Catholic priest of the name of Dunphy, and various sums of money, part of the estate, having been collected, a portion of which were in the hands of the present Appellant, some dissatisfaction arose on the part of his co-Executors."	Lord Romilly, Master of the Rolls; **Sir Fitz-Roy Kelly, The Lord Chief Baron**; Sir James W. Colvile; Sir Edward Vaughan Williams	Appeal allowed	Supreme Court of Nova Scotia
Kierzkowski v. Dorion	[1868] UKPC 23, LR 2 PC 291	"This is an Appeal from a Judgment of the Court of Queen's Bench of Lower Canada, reversing a Judgment of the Superior Court of that Province in an action by the Appellant against the Respondent."	Lord Chelmsford; Sir James W. Colvile; Lord Justice Wood; Lord Justice Selwyn	Appeal dismissed	Quebec Court of Queen's Bench (Appeal Side)
Evanturel v. Evanturel	[1869] UKPC 28, LR 2 PC 462	"The question raised upon this appeal related to the Will of the late Madame Evanturel, domiciled in Lower Canada, the validity of which depended upon the regularity of its execution, as required by the 289th Article of the Coutume de Paris. The Appellants insisted, in the court below, that the Will was invalid, upon two grounds; first, that the Testatrix had not legal capacity to make such Will, and that it was obtained by fraud and undue influence practised on her by the Respondent. This latter ground was abandoned in the course of the proceedings in Canada. And secondly, that it was not validly passed and executed according to the Law of Lower Canada."	Sir James W. Colvile; Sir Robert Phillimore, Judge of the Admiralty; Lord Justice Selwyn; Lord Justice Giffard	Appeal dismissed	Quebec Court of Queen's Bench (Appeal Side)
Ryland v. Delisle	[1869] UKPC 44	"The Canadian Act, 14th and 15th Vict., c. 51, consolidating and regulating the general clauses relating to Railways enacts by sect. 19, cl. 1, that 'each Shareholder shall be individually liable to the Creditors of the Company, to an amount equal to the amount unpaid on the Stock held by him, for the debts and liabilities thereof, and until the whole amount of his Stock shall have been paid up; but shall not be liable to an action therefore before an execution against the Company shall have been returned unsatisfied in whole or in part, and the amount due on such execution shall be the amount recoverable with costs against such Shareholders.' "	Sir James W. Colvile; Sir Joseph Napier; Lord Justice Giffard	Appeal allowed	Quebec Court of Queen's Bench (Appeal Side)

== Summary by year and result ==
Year	Number of Cases	Appeal Allowed		Appeal Dismissed	
1867	6	3	50%	3	50%
1868	2	1	50%	1	50%
1869	2	1	50%	1	50%
Total Cases	10	5	50.0%	5	50.0%
Yearly Averages	3.3	1.7		1.7	

== Summary by province ==
Province	Number of Appeals
Ontario	0
Quebec	9
Nova Scotia	1
New Brunswick	0
Total	10

== See also ==
- List of Canadian appeals to the Judicial Committee of the Privy Council, 1870–1879
- List of Canadian appeals to the Judicial Committee of the Privy Council, 1880–1889
- List of Canadian appeals to the Judicial Committee of the Privy Council, 1890–1899
- List of Canadian appeals to the Judicial Committee of the Privy Council, 1900–1909
- List of Canadian appeals to the Judicial Committee of the Privy Council, 1910–1919
- List of Canadian appeals to the Judicial Committee of the Privy Council, 1920–1929
- List of Canadian appeals to the Judicial Committee of the Privy Council, 1930–1939
- List of Canadian appeals to the Judicial Committee of the Privy Council, 1940–1949
- List of Canadian appeals to the Judicial Committee of the Privy Council, 1950–1959

== Sources ==
- British and Irish Legal Information Institute: Privy Council Decisions
- 1867 Privy Council Decisions
- 1868 Privy Council Decisions
- 1869 Privy Council Decisions
