= Rupert Kindersley, 4th Baron Kindersley =

British peer and businessman

Rupert John Molesworth Kindersley, 4th Baron Kindersley, is a British peer and businessman.

== Life and career ==
Kindersley was born in London on 31 March 1955, the son of Hugo Kindersley, 3rd Baron Kindersley, and Venice Marigold Hill, daughter of Lord Arthur Francis Henry Hill, second son of the 6th Marquess of Downshire. He has two younger brothers and one younger sister. He was educated at Eton College and the University of Toronto. He married Sarah Anne Warde in 1975: they have one son and one daughter. He was with the Toronto Dominion Bank from 1977 to 1980; Midland Bank from 1980 to 1985; the Daniels Group, from 1986 to 1993; Edgemark Capital Group from 1993 to 1998; a stockbroker with Brawley Cathers from 1999 to 2002; and director and treasurer at InnLand Hospitality from then.

Coat of arms of Rupert Kindersley, 4th Baron Kindersley
Crest Upon a mount Vert in front of a hawthorn tree Proper charged with an escutcheon Azure thereon a lion rampant Argent a greyhound sejant also Argent. Escutcheon Per bend Gules and Azure a lion rampant Argent within an orle of cross-crosslets and fleur-de-lys alternatively Or. Supporters On the dexter side a greyhound Argent gorged with a collar Azure charged with three cross-crosslets Or and on the sinister side a lion Argent gorged with a collar Gules charged as the dexter each standing upon a branch of hawthorn Proper. Motto Adjuvante Deo

Peerage of the United Kingdom
Preceded by Hugo Kindersley	Baron Kindersley; 2013–present	Incumbent; Heir apparent: Hon. Frederick Kindersley
