= Coal Industry Commission Act 1919 =

Act of the Parliament of the United Kingdom

Coal Industry Commission Act 1919 (Note: Section 6.)
- Act of Parliament
- Parliament of the United Kingdom
- Long title: An Act to constitute a Commission to inquire into the position of and conditions prevailing in the Coal Industry.
- Citation: 9 & 10 Geo. 5. c. 1
- Territorial extent: United Kingdom

Dates
- Royal assent: 26 February 1919
- Commencement: 26 February 1919 (Note: The Acts of Parliament (Commencement) Act 1793.)
- Repealed: 22 December 1927
Other legislation
Repealed by	Statute Law Revision Act 1927

Status: Repealed

Text of statute as originally enacted

The Coal Industry Commission Act 1919 (9 & 10 Geo. 5. c. 1) was an act of the Parliament of the United Kingdom, which set up a commission, led by Mr Justice Sankey (and so known as the "Sankey Commission"), to consider joint management or nationalisation of the coal mines. It also considered the issues of working conditions, wage and hours.

== Background ==
A royal commission, led by Sir John Sankey, was called to examine the future of the mining industry. Leo Chiozza Money, Sidney Webb and R.H. Tawney were the three economists on the commission, all broadly favourable to the miners. Others were appointed from business and the trade unions.

The commission offered compromises on wages and hours, and also recommended nationalisation. The government rejected the report. No agreement was reached and, when the commission reported in June 1919, it offered four separate approaches ranging from full nationalisation to continued private ownership. The government cited this disagreement as a reason to reject nationalisation.

The public impact of the report was such that, in Ben Travers' comic novel A Cuckoo in the Nest (1921), the Rev. Cathcart Sloley-Jones, under the illusion that he was addressing a Member of Parliament, "lowered his voice into a rather sinister whisper: 'What is Lloyd George's real view of the miners' report?'"

== Commissioners ==
- Mr Justice Sankey, chairman recommended modified nationalisation
- Frank Hodges, recommended nationalisation
- Leo Chiozza Money
- Robert Smillie
- Herbert Smith
- R. H. Tawney
- Sidney Webb
- Arthur Balfour, favoured minor reforms
- R. W. Cooper
- Sir Adam Nimmo
- Sir Allan M Smith
- Sir Evan Williams
- Sir Arthur Duckham, recommended reorganisation under private ownership

== Subsequent developments ==
The whole act was repealed by section 1 of, and part I of the schedule to, the Statute Law Revision Act 1927 (17 & 18 Geo. 5. c. 42), which came into force on 22 December 1927.

== See also ==
- UK labour law
- UK public service law

== Bibliography ==
- AJP Taylor The Oxford History of England: English History 1914-1945 (1965)
