= Hugo Kindersley, 3rd Baron Kindersley =

British peer, politician and businessman

Robert Hugh Molesworth "Hugo" Kindersley, 3rd Baron Kindersley DL (18 August 1929 – 9 October 2013) was a British peer, politician and businessman.

== Life and career ==
Kindersley was born on 18 August 1929 as son of Hugh Kindersley, 2nd Baron Kindersley and Nancy Farnsworth Boyd, daughter of Geoffrey Boyd. He had an older sister, Patricia Nassau Kindersley (1922–2010).

He was educated at Eton College and Trinity College, Oxford and served with the Scots Guards. In 1949 he was posted to Malaya. He reached the rank of Lieutenant. From 1957 to 1996 he was Director of the London Assurance. From 1958 to 1985 he was Director at the Witan Investment Co Ltd. From 1959 to 1967 he was Director of the Steel Company of Wales. From 1960 to 1991 he was Director of Lazard Bros and Co Ltd, from 1963 to 1968 at Marconi, from 1965 to 1996 at the Sun Alliance & London Insurance Group, from 1966 to 1968 at English Electric and from 1968 to 1970 at GEC Ltd.

He was from 1969 to 1973 Director of British Match Corporation Ltd, from 1973 to 1985 at Swedish Match Co, from 1986 to 2001 at Maersk Co Ltd and from 1990 to 2001 at Maersk India. He was from 1980 to 1989 Chairman of the Commonwealth Development Corporation. From 1990 to 2000 he managed the Siam Selective Growth Trust. From 1991 to 1992 he was Chairman of Brent Walker Group plc.

From 1975 to 1980 he was Deputy Chairman of the Advisory Council of the Export Credits Guarantee Department (ECGD). From 1961 to 1985 he was Financial Advisor at the Export Group for the Constructional Industries. From 1976 to 1978 he was Chairman of the BBA. From 1976 to 1986 he was President of the Anglo-Taiwan Trade Committee. He is Member of the Institute Intelligence d'Eac and the Hereditary Peerage Association.

== Member of the House of Lords ==
On the death of his father in 1976, he inherited the title of Baron Kindersley and a seat in the House of Lords where he sat as a Conservative. His maiden speech on 26 July 1982 was on the topic of economic policy.

Until the mid-1990s he gave speeches occasionally on alternative medicine, the Osteopaths Bill [H.L.], and several times on the Housing and Urban Development Bill and finally on 5 June 1995 on the Commonwealth Development Corporation (No. 2) Bill [H.L.].

He lost his seat by the implementation of the House of Lords Act 1999. He did not stand for one of the remaining seats.

== Family ==
Kindersley was married on 4 September 1954 to Venice Marigold "Rosie" Hill (1930–2016), a daughter of Lord Arthur Francis Henry Hill and Ishabel Wilhelmina Sheila MacDougall and sister of Robin Hill, 8th Marquess of Downshire. They were divorced in 1989. In the same year he married Patricia Norman, daughter of Brigadier Hugh Norman.

There were three sons and one daughter of the first marriage. His eldest son, Rupert John Molesworth Kindersley (born 1955), succeeded as 4th Baron. His second son died in 1991.

Coat of arms of Hugo Kindersley, 3rd Baron Kindersley
Crest Upon a mount Vert in front of a hawthorn tree Proper charged with an escutcheon Azure thereon a lion rampant Argent a greyhound sejant also Argent. Escutcheon Per bend Gules and Azure a lion rampant Argent within an orle of cross-crosslets and fleur-de-lys alternatively Or. Supporters On the dexter side a greyhound Argent gorged with a collar Azure charged with three cross-crosslets Or and on the sinister side a lion Argent gorged with a collar Gules charged as the dexter each standing upon a branch of hawthorn Proper. Motto Adjuvante Deo

Peerage of the United Kingdom
Preceded by Hugh Kindersley	Baron Kindersley; 1976–2013	Succeeded by Rupert Kindersley
