= Baron Kindersley =

Barony in the Peerage of the United Kingdom

Baron Kindersley, of West Hoathly in the County of Sussex, is a title in the Peerage of the United Kingdom. It was created in 1941 for the businessman Sir Robert Kindersley, chiefly in recognition of his work as President of the National Savings Committee. His second son, the second Baron, was a Brigadier in the Scots Guards. As of 2017 the title is held by the latter's grandson, the 4th Baron, who succeeded his father in 2013.

== Barons Kindersley (1941) ==
- Robert Molesworth Kindersley, 1st Baron Kindersley (1871–1954)
- Hugh Kenyon Molesworth Kindersley, 2nd Baron Kindersley (1899–1976)
- Robert Hugh Molesworth Kindersley, 3rd Baron Kindersley (1929–2013)
- Rupert John Molesworth Kindersley, 4th Baron Kindersley (b. 1955)

The heir apparent is the present holder's son the Hon. Frederick Hugh Molesworth Kindersley (b. 1987)

Coat of arms of Baron Kindersley
Crest Upon a mount Vert in front of a hawthorn tree Proper charged with an escutcheon Azure thereon a lion rampant Argent a greyhound sejant also Argent. Escutcheon Per bend Gules and Azure a lion rampant Argent within an orle of cross-crosslets and fleur-de-lys alternatively Or. Supporters On the dexter side a greyhound Argent gorged with a collar Azure charged with three cross-crosslets Or and on the sinister side a lion Argent gorged with a collar Gules charged as the dexter each standing upon a branch of hawthorn Proper. Motto Adjuvante Deo
