= Hugh Kindersley, 2nd Baron Kindersley =

British Army officer (1899–1976)

The Right Honourable The Baron Kindersley CBE MC
- Born: 7 May 1899; Knightsbridge, London, England
- Died: 6 October 1976 (aged 77); Tonbridge, Kent, England
- Relatives: Robert Kindersley, 1st Baron Kindersley (father)
- Military career
- Allegiance: United Kingdom
- Branch: British Army
- Service years: 1917–1946
- Rank: Brigadier
- Service number: 61108
- Unit: Scots Guards
- Commands: 6th Airlanding Brigade
- Conflicts: World War I World War II
- Awards: Commander of the Order of the British Empire; Military Cross; Commander of the Order of St. Olav

Brigadier Hugh Kenyon Molesworth Kindersley, 2nd Baron Kindersley of West Hoathly CBE MC (7 May 1899 – 6 October 1976) was a British Army officer, businessman, banker. His father was businessman Robert Kindersley, 1st Baron Kindersley GBE.

== Early years ==
Kindersley was born in Knightsbridge, London, to Robert Molesworth Kindersley, 1st Baron Kindersley, GBE (1871-1954), and Gladys Margaret Beadle. He was educated at Eton College.

He married Nancy Farnsworth (daughter of Dr Geoffrey Boyd of Toronto) in October 1921: they had two daughters, Patricia, who married Napier Crookenden, Ginette and a son Robert, who succeeded his father as 3rd Baron Kindersley.

Kindersley was managing director of Lazard Brothers, one of the three houses of Lazard, from 1927 to 1964.

=== War service ===
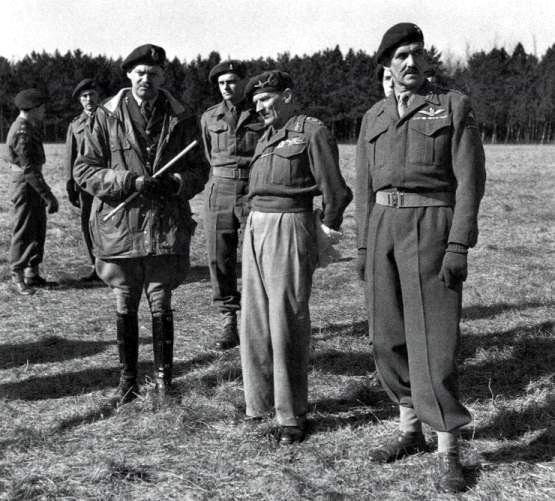
Major-general Richard Gale (left), General Sir Bernard Montgomery (centre), and Brigadier Hugh Kindersley during Montgomery's visit to the 6th Airborne Division at Salisbury, March 1944.

Kindersley was commissioned into the Scots Guards in 1917 and served during the First World War. He was awarded the Military Cross in 1918. He rejoined as a lieutenant in the Regular Army Reserve of Officers from 12 November 1938 and at the outbreak of the Second World War he rejoined the Scots Guards. He later commanded a tank battalion of the Scots Guards in the Guards Armoured Division.

He completed a parachute training course and qualified as a glider pilot. In May 1943, promoted to acting brigadier, Kindersley was appointed commanding officer of the 6th Airlanding Brigade. It was on his recommendation that Major John Howard and D Company 2nd Oxfordshire and Buckinghamshire Light Infantry (the 52nd) were selected to lead the coup de main operation at Pegasus Bridge and Horsa Bridge before the Allied invasion of the Normandy beaches began. Kindersley commanded 6 Airlanding Brigade, part of 6th Airborne Division, during the Normandy landings on D Day, 6 June 1944, landing at 03.30 hours with 6 Airborne divisional headquarters. He was later wounded during the Battle of Bréville, and evacuated to England. Brigadier Edwin Flavell replaced him as commanding officer of 6 Airlanding Brigade.

Kindersley was appointed a Member of the Order of the British Empire (OBE) in 1941 and commander of the Order of the British Empire (CBE) in 1945.

== Post-war ==
Kindersley was Chairman of Lazard Brothers, one of the three houses of Lazard, from 1953 until 1964 and a director from 1965 to 1971. During his service at Lazard Brothers, he was a director of the Bank of England from March 1947 to March 1967, Chairman of Royal Exchange Assurance from 1955 to 1967, and Chairman of Rolls-Royce Limited from 1956 to 1968. He was one of the figures who, as both a Bank of England director and a financier with private interests, was suspected of having taken advantage of advance warning of a change in Bank Rate to sell gilt-edged securities ahead of the public announcement of the rate change. A judicial inquiry was held to investigate these allegations in 1957, to which he gave evidence. Although subjected to intensive and aggressive questioning by the Solicitor General Reginald Manningham-Buller during the proceedings, he was fully exonerated in Lord Justice Parker's subsequent report in what journalists at the time suspected of a whitewash.

Kindersley was chairman of the Officers Association from 1946 to 1956, honorary colonel of 10th Parachute Battalion from 1947 to 1952 and High Sheriff of the County of London in 1951. He succeeded his father as second baron in 1954. He was appointed Commander, Royal Order of St Olav of Norway in 1958.

He also served as chairman, Review Body on Doctors' and Dentists' Remuneration, 1962-1970 and as chairman, Arthritis and Rheumatism Council.

He lived in Leigh, near Tonbridge, Kent. Hugh Kenyon Molesworth Kindersley died at Tonbridge, Kent on 6 October 1976 and he was succeeded in the barony by his son, Robert Hugh Molesworth Kindersley.

== Awards and decorations ==
- Commander of the Order of the British Empire (1 February 1945; previously Member, 1 January 1941)
- Military Cross (15 February 1919)
- Commander of the Order of St Olav (Norway, 1958)
- Honorary Fellowship of the Royal College of Surgeons (1959)
- Member, Court of Patrons, Royal College of Surgeons (1960)
- Royal College of Surgeons Honorary Gold Medal (1975)

Citation for the Military Cross:

For great gallantry and able leadership during 11, 12 and 13 October 1918. When sent by night to support the advance to the railway line west of St. Python, his platoon captured an obstinately defended machinegun post. Next morning, when leading two platoons in the western and southern half of the village, he handled the house to house fighting admirably. The ground was won and held with few casualties largely through his work. His gallant conduct was a fine example to all ranks.

Coat of arms of Hugh Kindersley, 2nd Baron Kindersley
Crest Upon a mount Vert in front of a hawthorn tree Proper charged with an escutcheon Azure thereon a lion rampant Argent a greyhound sejant also Argent. Escutcheon Per bend Gules and Azure a lion rampant Argent within an orle of cross-crosslets and fleur-de-lys alternatively Or. Supporters On the dexter side a greyhound Argent gorged with a collar Azure charged with three cross-crosslets Or and on the sinister side a lion Argent gorged with a collar Gules charged as the dexter each standing upon a branch of hawthorn Proper. Motto Adjuvante Deo

Honorary titles
Preceded by Ralph Brook	High Sheriff of the County of London; 1951–1952	Succeeded by Sir George Bolton
Peerage of the United Kingdom
Preceded by Robert Kindersley	Baron Kindersley; 1954–1976	Succeeded by Robert Kindersley
