= Chung Chuck =

Canadian civil rights activist

Chung Chuck, born Chung Mor Ping in 1897 in Canton Province, China, emigrated in 1909 to Ladner, British Columbia, Canada. He died on December 8, 1986.

== Personal life ==
He married Mary (May Lee, 1907–1969) in 1940. They had six children: two sons and four daughters.

Chung Chuck was a potato farmer who fought for the rights of ethnic groups, including Chinese settlers in Canada who were subject to discrimination, including a head tax and other discriminatory policies. He was known as the "Delta Rifleman" for breaking an illegal blockade that targeted and stopped Chinese farmers from selling their produce.

== Additional sources ==
- http://www.canada.com/story_print.html?id=22269303-9a80-4d7d-b146-3dc5c0b9ea42&sponsor%5B‍%5D
- http://www.vancouverhistory.ca/chronology1986.htm
- http://www.narrativethreads.ca/explorer-explore/panier_demigres_chinois-chinese_settlement_basket.html
