= Jemima Kindersley =

- Born: Jemima Wickstead; 2 October 1741; Norwich, Norfolk, England
- Died: 1809; Bath, Somerset, England
- Occupation: English travel writer
- Known for: Letters from the Island of Teneriffe, Brazil, the Cape of Good Hope and the East Indies
- Spouse: Colonel Nathaniel Kindersley
- Children: Nathaniel Edward Kindersley

Jemima Kindersley née Wickstead (1741–1809) was an English travel writer, noted for her Letters from the Island of Teneriffe, Brazil, the Cape of Good Hope and the East Indies (1777).

== Life ==
Jemima Wickstead was born in Norwich on 2 October 1741. She was well educated and widely read. She married Colonel Nathaniel Kindersley, of the Bengal Artillery, in 1762 at Great Yarmouth. They had a son, Nathaniel Edward Kindersley (1763-1831). She set sail for India in June 1764, her husband having traveled there earlier, and arrived in Pondicherry in June 1765, stopping along the way in Tenerife, Brazil and South Africa. She stayed in India until 1769, and died in Bath in 1809.

== Writings ==
Kindersley wrote an account of her long voyage to India, including five months at the Cape of Good Hope, in the form of 68 letters. These were published in 1777 by John Nourse under the title of "Letters from the Island of Teneriffe, Brazil, the Cape of Good Hope and the East Indies by Mrs. Kindersley", at the price of 3s 6d.

These letters were republished as volume 5 of the 8-volume Women's Travel Writing, 1750-1850 edited by Caroline Franklin (Routledge, 2000: ISBN 9780415320344) and included in Routledge's online resource History of Feminism.

In 1781 she published a translation of Antoine Léonard Thomas's work as Essay on the Character, Manners and Understanding of Women, including two of her own essays.

== Response to writings ==
In 1778 the Reverend Henry Hodgson published Letters to Mrs. Kindersley, described as "animadverting upon portions of that lady's "Letters from the Island of Teneriffe," etc."

== Writings on India ==
Kindersley's letters do not tell us about her. She is rather a passive recipient, ventriquolising all that she sees, much like Chaucer's narrator in his The Canterbury Tales. She doesn't actively participate in these accounts which are perhaps about the most important journey of her lifetime. Yet they give us invaluable information about the mid-18th century, a chaotic and little known period. This period was marked by an indeterminacy as the power shifted from the previous Mughal rule to the emerging British colonisers. Kindersley observes all these, and writes them in her letters, providing a historical source to one of the most undocumented periods in Indian literature and history.

Kindersley first landed on the soil of Pondicherry. At that time, Pondicherry had just faced the Third Carnatic War, and Kindersley was appalled by its site, and the "stark nakedness" of the common folk. Patna appeared to her as "miserable". She spent most of her time in Allahabad. About this place, her letters show an eclectic tone: she records the flamboyant Mughal military processions vis-a-vis their decreasing power; a fakir lost in the remembering of his mother beside her burial mound near the Ganges, "refusing to budge even during the torrential rains".

Jemima Kindersley did not harbour any romantic views like the other colonists such as William James, etc. They appreciated the spiritual knowledge of India. However, Kindersley firmly believed that the colonial rule was fulfilling the white man's burden in India. And her epistolary accounts addressed to an unnamed person charts her "astute observations and reflections of the period when the Mughal regime was on the verge of decline". The British a few years later soon acquired the diwani of Bengal. Moreover, as local rulers began separating from the erstwhile empire, the Company's position strengthened. Kindersley asked: “[i]n such a government can we wonder, that the general characteristic of the inhabitants should be stupidity and low cunning?”. Following the tone of her fellow countrymen, she highlighted how the place had to be saved by the British.

Kindersley said: "Hindus were superstitious and bound by rigid caste hierarchies", noting also now the merchants were greedy, and the entire mass of people were largely feminine and indolent. She bitterly portrays the social landscape. Kindersley's letters also speak of the Rajputs and Marathas as the "fighting castes", and the banias, who performed the role of “intermediaries and interlocutors” given their workable command over the English language.

Speaking about the economic activities she noted how majority of Indians were employed in weaving, and identified the best muslin centres as being located in Dacca, now Dhaka in Bangladesh. She even observed the slow nature of the work, and how the workers, who were mostly men, at these places had to have a great deal of patience. Her letters also speak about the difference in the quality of the muslin and embroidered cloths produced for the Emperor and those made for Europeans, merchants and the common people.

For the colonial white-woman, life of the natives were simple. Though Kindersley complicates her account by suggesting how the locals also enjoyed several forms of entertainment like tamashes, weddings, festivals, etc. Kindersley had undertaken several journeys across the river routes while being in India. These journeys to Patna from Calcutta and later to Allahabad, were made on "budgerows: long, spacious boats which plied commonly on the Ganges, after the monsoons." Kindersley however says how during the summer seasons the mode of transport changed and people preferred palanquins or palkis.

Kindersley was deeply curious about the position of women in the society. The women question would always fascinate her. She would even translate the French "Essay on the Character, Manners, and Understanding of Women in Different Ages" by Antoine Leonard Thomas. She also noted the luxurious yet the constrained lives of the "Muhammedan women in seraglio" had to live. While she lived in India, she could access the zennanah. Her letters speak about a luxurious but non-admirable lives inside these spaces. Here women were "confined from public view", she wrote, and they had no knowledge of the outside world. Smoking huqqa and watching courtesans perform was their only activity. About the Hindu women, her letters claim how they too were forced to live a similar life.

Travelogues are usually classified by Historians, who then place it within a contextual frame, on the basis of style, content, etc. This task gets extremely confusing when it comes to Kindersley and her travel accounts. She emerged on the scene several decades before the "well-known and better-anthologised writers such as Maria Graham and Eliza Fay" while her style was evocative of that of "Niccolo de Conti (of the early 15th century), and Ralph Fitch and Jean-Baptiste Tavernier in the 17th century".
