= List of Canadian appeals to the Judicial Committee of the Privy Council =

List of Canadian appeals to the JCPC

This is a comprehensive list of cases originating in Canada decided by the Judicial Committee of the Privy Council, in Britain.

From 1867 to 1949, the Judicial Committee of the Privy Council was the highest court of appeal for Canada (and, separately, for Newfoundland, which did not join Canada as a province until 1949). During this period, its decisions on Canadian appeals were binding precedent on all Canadian courts, including the Supreme Court of Canada. Any decisions from this era that the Supreme Court of Canada has not overruled since gaining appellate supremacy in 1949 remain good law, and continue to bind all Canadian courts other than the Supreme Court. As Canada's ultimate judicial authority for most of its first century as a country following Confederation, the Judicial Committee had a considerable influence on the development of Canadian law, particularly constitutional law, where the living tree doctrine first laid down in Edwards v Canada (AG) remains a defining feature of Canadian constitutional interpretation.

The Parliament of Canada abolished appeals to the Judicial Committee of criminal cases in 1933 and civil cases in 1949. Ongoing cases that had begun before those dates remained appealable to the Judicial Committee. The final Judicial Committee ruling on a Canadian case was rendered in 1959, in Ponoka-Calmar Oils v Wakefield, an appeal from the Supreme Court.

== 1867–1869 ==
=== List of cases ===
For a detailed list of all cases during this period, please see: List of Canadian appeals to the Judicial Committee of the Privy Council, 1867–1869.

=== Summary by year and result ===
| Year | Number of Cases | Appeal Allowed | | Appeal Dismissed | |
|---|---|---|---|---|---|
| 1867 | 6 | 3 | 50% | 3 | 50% |
| 1868 | 2 | 1 | 50% | 1 | 50% |
| 1869 | 2 | 1 | 50% | 1 | 50% |
| Total Cases | 10 | 5 | 50.0% | 5 | 50.0% |
| Yearly Averages | 3.3 | 1.7 | | 1.7 | |

=== Summary by province ===
| Province | Number of Cases |
|---|---|
| Ontario | 0 |
| Quebec | 9 |
| Nova Scotia | 1 |
| New Brunswick | 0 |
| Total | 10 |

== 1870–1879 ==
=== List of cases ===
For a detailed list of all cases during this period, please see: List of Canadian appeals to the Judicial Committee of the Privy Council, 1870–1879.

=== Summary by year and result ===
| Year | Number of Cases | Appeal Allowed | | Appeal Dismissed | |
|---|---|---|---|---|---|
| 1870 | 4 | 2 | 50.0% | 2 | 50.0% |
| 1871 | 1 | 0 | 0.0% | 1 | 100.0% |
| 1872 | 7 | 2 | 28.6% | 5 | 71.4% |
| 1873 | 13 | 7 | 53.8% | 6 | 46.2% |
| 1874 | 12 | 7 | 58.3% | 5 | 41.7% |
| 1875 | 7 | 3 | 42.9% | 4 | 57.1% |
| 1876 | 10 | 3 | 30.0% | 7 | 70% |
| 1877 | 4 | 2 | 50.0% | 2 | 50.0% |
| 1878 | 7 | 0 | 0.0% | 7 | 100.0% |
| 1879 | 3 | 0 | 0.0% | 3 | 100.0% |
| Total Cases | 68 | 26 | 38.2% | 42 | 61.8% |
| Yearly Averages | 6.8 | 2.6 | | 4.2 | |

=== Summary by province and court appealed from ===
| Province | Number of Cases | On Appeal from Supreme Court of Canada | | On Appeal from Provincial Courts | |
|---|---|---|---|---|---|
| Ontario | 2 | 0 | 0.0% | 2 | 100.0% |
| Quebec | 56 | 2 | 3.6% | 54 | 96.4% |
| Nova Scotia | 6 | 0 | 0.0% | 6 | 100.0% |
| New Brunswick | 4 | 0 | 0.0% | 4 | 100.0% |
| Manitoba | 0 | 0 | 0.0% | 0 | 0.0% |
| British Columbia | 0 | 0 | 0.0% | 0 | 0.0% |
| Prince Edward Island | 0 | 0 | 0.0% | 0 | 0.0% |
| Total | 68 | 2 | 3.0% | 66 | 97.0% |

== 1880–1889 ==
=== List of cases ===
For a detailed list of all cases during this period, please see: List of Canadian appeals to the Judicial Committee of the Privy Council, 1880–1889.

=== Summary by year and result ===
| Year | Number of Cases | Appeal Allowed | | Appeal Dismissed | |
|---|---|---|---|---|---|
| 1880 | 5 | 2 | 40.0% | 3 | 60.0% |
| 1881 | 3 | 2 | 66.7% | 1 | 33.3% |
| 1882 | 5 | 2 | 40.0% | 3 | 60% |
| 1883 | 11 | 7 | 63.6% | 4 | 36.4% |
| 1884 | 4 | 1 | 25.0% | 3 | 75.0% |
| 1885 | 5 | 1 | 20.0% | 4 | 80.0% |
| 1886 | 9 | 3 | 33.3% | 6 | 66.7% |
| 1887 | 6 | 2 | 33.3% | 4 | 66.7% |
| 1888 | 8 | 0 | 0.0% | 8 | 100.0% |
| 1889 | 10 | 2 | 20.0% | 8 | 80.0% |
| Total Cases | 66 | 22 | 33.3% | 44 | 66.7% |
| Yearly Averages | 6.6 | 2.2 | | 4.4 | |

=== Summary by jurisdiction and court appealed from ===
| Jurisdiction | Number of Cases | On Appeal from Supreme Court of Canada | | On Appeal from Other Courts | |
|---|---|---|---|---|---|
| Federal | 3 | 3 | 100.0% | 0 | 0.0% |
| Ontario | 17 | 12 | 70.6% | 5 | 29.4% |
| Quebec | 31 | 8 | 25.8% | 23 | 74.2% |
| Nova Scotia | 8 | 1 | 12.5% | 7 | 87.5% |
| New Brunswick | 5 | 3 | 60.0% | 2 | 40.0% |
| Manitoba | 1 | 0 | 0.0% | 1 | 100.0% |
| British Columbia | 0 | 0 | 0.0% | 0 | 0.0% |
| Prince Edward Island | 0 | 0 | 0.0% | 0 | 0.0% |
| North-West Territories (Note: There was one case from the North-West Territories which went on appeal to the Manitoba Queen's Bench, since there was no appellate court in the North-West Territories as that time. The Judicial Committee dismissed an application for leave to appeal from the Manitoba Queen's Bench: Riel v Her Majesty the Queen, [1885] UKPC 37.) | 1 | 0 | 0.0% | 1 | 100.0% |
| Total | 66 | 27 | 40.9% | 39 | 59.1% |

== 1890–1899 ==
=== List of cases ===
For a detailed list of all cases during this period, please see: List of Canadian appeals to the Judicial Committee of the Privy Council, 1890–1899.

=== Summary by year and result ===
| Year | Number of Cases | Appeal Allowed | | Appeal Dismissed | |
|---|---|---|---|---|---|
| 1890 | 2 | 1 | 50.0% | 1 | 50.0% |
| 1891 | 2 | 1 | 50.0% | 1 | 50.0% |
| 1892 | 10 | 5 | 50.0% | 5 | 50.0% |
| 1893 | 6 | 3 | 50.0% | 3 | 50.0% |
| 1894 | 6 | 2 | 33.3% | 4 | 66.7% |
| 1895 | 11 | 3 | 27.3% | 8 | 72.7% |
| 1896 | 12 | 6 | 50.0% | 6 | 50.0% |
| 1897 | 6 | 1 | 16.7% | 5 | 83.3% |
| 1898 | 8 | 5 | 62.5% | 3 | 37.5% |
| 1899 | 13 | 4 | 30.8% | 9 | 69.2% |
| Total Cases | 76 | 31 | 40.8% | 45 | 59.2% |
| Yearly Averages | 7.6 | 3.1 | | 4.5 | |

=== Summary by jurisdiction and court appealed from ===
| Jurisdiction | Number of Cases | On Appeal from Supreme Court of Canada | | On Appeal from Other Courts | |
|---|---|---|---|---|---|
| Federal | 6 | 6 | 100.0% | 0 | 0.0% |
| Ontario | 17 | 6 | 35.3% | 11 | 64.7% |
| Quebec | 32 | 5 | 15.6% | 27 | 84.4% |
| Nova Scotia | 6 | 0 | 0.0% | 6 | 100.0% |
| New Brunswick | 2 | 1 | 50.0% | 1 | 50.0% |
| Manitoba | 5 | 2 | 40.0% | 3 | 60.0% |
| British Columbia | 8 | 1 | 12.5% | 7 | 87.5% |
| Prince Edward Island | 0 | 0 | 0.0% | 0 | 0.0% |
| North-West Territories | 0 | 0 | 0.0% | 0 | 0.0% |
| Yukon | 0 | 0 | 0.0% | 0 | 0.0% |
| Total | 76 | 21 | 27.6% | 55 | 72.4% |

== 1900–1909 ==
=== List of cases ===
For a detailed list of all cases during this period, please see: List of Canadian appeals to the Judicial Committee of the Privy Council, 1900–1909.

=== Summary by year and result ===
| Year | Number of Cases | Appeal Allowed | | Appeal Dismissed | |
|---|---|---|---|---|---|
| 1900 | 6 | 3 | 50.0% | 3 | 50.0% |
| 1901 | 5 | 3 | 60.0% | 2 | 40.0% |
| 1902 | 10 | 5 | 50.0% | 5 | 50.0% |
| 1903 | 13 | 3 | 23.1% | 10 | 76.9% |
| 1904 | 14 | 5 | 35.7% | 9 | 64.3% |
| 1905 | 9 | 6 | 66.7% | 3 | 33.3% |
| 1906 | 18 | 6 | 33.3% | 12 | 66.7% |
| 1907 | 15 | 8 | 53.3% | 7 | 46.7% |
| 1908 | 14 | 5 | 35.7% | 9 | 64.3% |
| 1909 | 14 | 6 | 42.9% | 8 | 57.1% |
| Total Cases | 118 | 50 | 42.4% | 68 | 57.6% |
| Annual Averages | 11.8 | 4.2 | | 5.8 | |

=== Summary by jurisdiction and court appealed from ===
| Jurisdiction | Number of Cases | On Appeal from Supreme Court of Canada | | On Appeal from Other Courts | |
|---|---|---|---|---|---|
| Federal | 15 | 15 | 100.0% | 0 | 0.0% |
| Ontario | 38 | 11 | 28.9% | 27 | 71.1% |
| Quebec | 43 | 8 | 18.6% | 35 | 81.4% |
| Nova Scotia | 2 | 0 | 0.0% | 2 | 100.0% |
| New Brunswick | 2 | 1 | 50.0% | 1 | 50.0% |
| Manitoba | 2 | 1 | 50.0% | 1 | 50.0% |
| British Columbia | 13 | 2 | 15.4% | 11 | 84.6% |
| Prince Edward Island | 0 | 0 | 0.0% | 0 | 0.0% |
| North-West Territories | 1 | 1 | 100.0% | 0 | 0.0% |
| Yukon | 2 | 2 | 100.0% | 0 | 0.0% |
| Total | 118 | 41 | 34.7% | 77 | 65.3% |

== 1910–1919 ==
=== List of cases ===
For a detailed list of all cases during this period, please see: List of Canadian appeals to the Judicial Committee of the Privy Council, 1910–1919.

=== Summary by year and result ===
| Year | Number of Cases | Appeal Allowed | | Appeal Dismissed | |
|---|---|---|---|---|---|
| 1910 | 19 | 8 | 42.1% | 11 | 57.9% |
| 1911 | 16 | 6 | 37.5% | 10 | 62.5% |
| 1912 | 26 | 12 | 46.2% | 14 | 53.8% |
| 1913 | 19 | 14 | 73.7% | 5 | 26.3% |
| 1914 | 30 | 10 | 33.3% | 20 | 66.7% |
| 1915 | 11 | 6 | 54.5% | 5 | 45.5% |
| 1916 (Note: In one reference decision in this year, the Judicial Committee simply answered the questions without allowing or dismissing the appeal: Attorney General for Ontario and others v Attorney General for Canada and others, [1916] UKPC 13.) | 23 | 9 | 39.1% | 13 | 56.5% |
| 1917 | 14 | 4 | 28.6% | 10 | 71.4% |
| 1918 | 8 | 3 | 37.5% | 5 | 62.5% |
| 1919 | 36 | 11 | 30.6% | 25 | 69.4% |
| Total Cases | 202 | 83 | 41.1% | 118 | 58.4% |
| Yearly Averages | 20.2 | 8.3 | | 11.8 | |

=== Summary by jurisdiction and court appealed from ===
| Jurisdiction | Number of Cases | On Appeal from Supreme Court of Canada | | On Appeal from Other Courts | |
|---|---|---|---|---|---|
| Federal | 19 | 18 | 94.7% | 1 | 5.3% |
| Ontario | 63 | 13 | 20.6% | 50 | 79.4% |
| Quebec | 37 | 10 | 27.0% | 27 | 73.9% |
| Nova Scotia | 8 | 5 | 62.5% | 3 | 37.5% |
| New Brunswick | 1 | 1 | 100.0% | 0 | 0.0% |
| Manitoba | 13 | 1 | 7.7% | 12 | 92.3% |
| British Columbia | 47 | 6 | 12.8% | 41 | 87.2% |
| Prince Edward Island | 0 | 0 | 0.0% | 0 | 0.0% |
| Saskatchewan | 5 | 2 | 40.0% | 3 | 60.0% |
| Alberta | 11 | 3 | 27.3% | 8 | 72.7% |
| Northwest Territories | 0 | 0 | 0.0% | 0 | 0.0% |
| Yukon | 0 | 0 | 0.0% | 0 | 0.0% |
| Total | 204 | 59 | 28.9% | 145 | 71.1% |

== 1920–1929 ==
=== List of cases ===
For a detailed list of all cases during this period, please see: List of Canadian appeals to the Judicial Committee of the Privy Council, 1920–1929.

=== Summary by year and result ===
| Year | Number of Cases | Appeal Allowed | | Appeal Dismissed | |
|---|---|---|---|---|---|
| 1920 | 19 | 10 | 52.6% | 9 | 47.4% |
| 1921 | 17 | 6 | 35.3% | 11 | 64.7% |
| 1922 (Note: In one case in this year, the parties settled the case before the Judicial Committee rendered a decision: Foley Brothers and others v. James A McIlwee and others, [1922] UKPC 18. The case is not included in the statistics.) | 18 | 7 | 38.9% | 11 | 61.1% |
| 1923 | 19 | 6 | 31.6% | 13 | 68.4% |
| 1924 | 17 | 9 | 52.9% | 8 | 47.1% |
| 1925 | 18 | 9 | 50.0% | 9 | 50.0% |
| 1926 | 21 | 8 | 38.1% | 13 | 61.9% |
| 1927 (Note: One case this year was a direct reference by the British government, on the joint request of the governments of Canada and Newfoundland: In the Matter of the Boundary between the Dominion of Canada and the Colony of Newfoundland in the Labrador Peninsula, [1927] UKPC 25. Since it was not an appeal, it is not included in the statistics for appeals allowed and dismissed.) | 14 | 2 | 14.3% | 11 | 78.6% |
| 1928 | 16 | 5 | 31.3% | 11 | 68.7% |
| 1929 | 15 | 7 | 46.7% | 8 | 53.3% |
| Total Cases | 174 | 69 | 39.7% | 104 | 59.8% |
| Yearly Averages | 17.4 | 6.9 | | 10.4 | |

=== Summary by jurisdiction and court appealed from ===
| Jurisdiction | Number of Cases | On Appeal from Supreme Court of Canada | | On Appeal from Other Courts | |
|---|---|---|---|---|---|
| Original Jurisdiction (Reference Question) (Note: One case was a direct reference by the British government, on the joint request of the governments of Canada and Newfoundland: In the Matter of the Boundary between the Dominion of Canada and the Colony of Newfoundland in the Labrador Peninsula, [1927] UKPC 25. It is not included in the totals of appeals from the Supreme Court or other courts.) | 1 | — | 0.0% | — | 0.0% |
| Federal | 26 | 22 | 84.6% | 4 | 15.4% |
| Ontario | 40 | 5 | 12.5% | 35 | 87.5% |
| Quebec | 53 | 18 | 34.0% | 35 | 66.0% |
| Nova Scotia | 8 | 3 | 37.5% | 5 | 62.5% |
| New Brunswick | 4 | 0 | 0.0% | 4 | 100.0% |
| Manitoba | 5 | 1 | 20.0% | 4 | 80.0% |
| British Columbia | 23 | 6 | 26.1% | 17 | 73.9% |
| Prince Edward Island | 0 | 0 | 0.0% | 0 | 0.0% |
| Saskatchewan | 3 | 0 | 0.0% | 3 | 100.0% |
| Alberta | 10 | 4 | 40.0% | 6 | 60.0% |
| North-West Territories | 0 | 0 | 0.0% | 0 | 0.0% |
| Yukon | 1 | 0 | 0.0% | 1 | 100.0% |
| Total | 174 | 59 | 33.9% | 114 | 65.5% |

== 1930–1939 ==
=== List of cases ===
For a detailed list of all cases during this period, please see: List of Canadian appeals to the Judicial Committee of the Privy Council, 1930–1939.

=== Summary by year and result ===
| Year | Number of Cases | Appeal Allowed | | Appeal Dismissed | |
|---|---|---|---|---|---|
| 1930 | 15 | 6 | 40.0% | 9 | 60.0% |
| 1931 | 18 | 10 | 55.6% | 8 | 44.4% |
| 1932 | 15 | 8 | 53.3% | 7 | 46.7% |
| 1933 | 14 | 6 | 42.9% | 8 | 57.1% |
| 1934 | 16 | 7 | 43.8% | 9 | 56.2% |
| 1935 | 13 | 2 | 15.4% | 11 | 84.6% |
| 1936 | 8 | 4 | 50.0% | 4 | 50.0% |
| 1937 | 19 | 8 | 42.1% | 11 | 57.9% |
| 1938 | 11 | 4 | 36.4% | 7 | 63.6% |
| 1939 | 11 | 2 | 18.2% | 9 | 81.8% |
| Total Cases | 140 | 57 | 40.7% | 83 | 59.3% |
| Yearly Averages | 14 | 5.7 | | 8.3 | |

=== Summary by jurisdiction and court appealed from ===
| Jurisdiction | Number of Cases | On Appeal from Supreme Court of Canada | | On Appeal from Other Courts | |
|---|---|---|---|---|---|
| Federal | 39 | 35 | 89.7% | 4 | 10.3% |
| Ontario | 39 | 4 | 10.3% | 35 | 89.7% |
| Quebec | 26 | 6 | 23.1% | 20 | 76.9% |
| Nova Scotia | 3 | 2 | 66.7% | 1 | 33.3% |
| New Brunswick | 1 | 1 | 100.0% | 0 | 0.0% |
| Manitoba | 5 | 4 | 80.0% | 1 | 20.0% |
| British Columbia | 20 | 3 | 15.0% | 17 | 85.0% |
| Prince Edward Island | 0 | 0 | 0.0% | 0 | 0.0% |
| Saskatchewan | 1 | 0 | 0.0% | 1 | 100.0% |
| Alberta | 6 | 1 | 16.7% | 5 | 83.3% |
| Newfoundland | 0 | 0 | 0.0% | 0 | 0.0% |
| North-West Territories | 0 | 0 | 0.0% | 0 | 0.0% |
| Yukon | 0 | 0 | 0.0% | 0 | 0.0% |
| Total | 140 | 56 | 40.0% | 84 | 60.0% |

== 1940–1949 ==
=== List of cases ===
For a detailed list of all cases during this period, please see: List of Canadian appeals to the Judicial Committee of the Privy Council, 1940–1949.

=== Summary by year and result ===
| Year | Number of Cases | Appeal Allowed | | Appeal Dismissed | |
|---|---|---|---|---|---|
| 1940 | 4 | 2 | 50.0% | 2 | 50.0% |
| 1941 | 3 | 3 | 100.0% | 0 | 0.0% |
| 1942 | 5 | 1 | 20.0% | 4 | 80.0% |
| 1943 | 3 | 1 | 33.3% | 2 | 66.7% |
| 1944 | 2 | 1 | 50.0% | 1 | 50.0% |
| 1945 | 3 | 2 | 66.7% | 1 | 33.3% |
| 1946 | 11 | 2 | 18.2% | 9 | 81.8% |
| 1947 | 5 | 2 | 40.0% | 3 | 60.0% |
| 1948 | 4 | 2 | 50.0% | 2 | 50.0% |
| 1949 | 6 | 3 | 50.0% | 3 | 50.0% |
| Total Cases | 46 | 19 | 41.3% | 27 | 58.7% |
| Yearly Averages | 4.6 | 1.9 | | 2.7 | |

=== Summary by jurisdiction and court appealed from ===
| Jurisdiction | Number of Cases | On Appeal from Supreme Court of Canada | | On Appeal from Other Courts | |
|---|---|---|---|---|---|
| Federal | 15 | 15 | 100.0% | 0 | 0.0% |
| Ontario | 10 | 3 | 30.0% | 7 | 70.0% |
| Quebec | 4 | 2 | 50.0% | 2 | 50.0% |
| Nova Scotia | 0 | 0 | 0.0% | 0 | 0.0% |
| New Brunswick | 4 | 4 | 100.0% | 0 | 0.0% |
| Manitoba | 1 | 1 | 100.0% | 0 | 0.0% |
| British Columbia | 5 | 1 | 20.0% | 4 | 80.0% |
| Prince Edward Island | 0 | 0 | 0.0% | 0 | 0.0% |
| Saskatchewan | 3 | 2 | 66.7% | 1 | 33.3% |
| Alberta | 4 | 2 | 50.0% | 2 | 50.0% |
| North-West Territories | 0 | 0 | 0.0% | 0 | 0.0% |
| Yukon | 0 | 0 | 0.0% | 0 | 0.0% |
| Total | 46 | 30 | 65.2% | 16 | 34.8% |

== 1950–1959 ==
=== List of cases ===
For a detailed list of all cases during this period, please see: List of Canadian appeals to the Judicial Committee of the Privy Council, 1950–1959.

=== Summary by year and result ===
| Year | Number of Cases | Appeal Allowed | | Appeal Dismissed | |
|---|---|---|---|---|---|
| 1950 | 4 | 3 | 75.0% | 1 | 25.0% |
| 1951 | 7 | 4 | 57.1% | 3 | 42.9% |
| 1952 | 6 | 5 | 83.3% | 1 | 16.7% |
| 1953 | 6 | 2 | 33.3% | 4 | 66.7% |
| 1954 | 2 | 1 | 50.0% | 1 | 50.0% |
| 1955 | 4 | 3 | 75.0% | 1 | 25.0% |
| 1956 | 0 | 0 | 0.0% | 0 | 0.0% |
| 1957 | 0 | 0 | 0.0% | 0 | 0.0% |
| 1958 | 0 | 0 | 0.0% | 0 | 0.0% |
| 1959 | 2 | 1 | 50.0% | 1 | 50.0% |
| Total Cases | 31 | 19 | 61.3% | 12 | 38.7% |
| Yearly Averages | 3.1 | 1.9 | | 1.2 | |

=== Summary by jurisdiction and court appealed from ===
| Jurisdiction | Number of Cases | On Appeal from Supreme Court of Canada | | On Appeal from Other Courts | |
|---|---|---|---|---|---|
| Federal | 8 | 8 | 100.0% | 0 | 0.0% |
| Ontario | 8 | 4 | 50.0% | 4 | 50.0% |
| Quebec | 3 | 3 | 100.0% | 0 | 0.0% |
| Nova Scotia | 0 | 0 | 0.0% | 0 | 0.0% |
| New Brunswick | 1 | 1 | 100.0% | 0 | 0.0% |
| Manitoba | 2 | 2 | 100.0% | 0 | 0.0% |
| British Columbia | 3 | 3 | 100.0% | 0 | 0.0% |
| Prince Edward Island | 0 | 0 | 0.0% | 0 | 0.0% |
| Saskatchewan | 1 | 1 | 100.0% | 0 | 0.0% |
| Alberta | 5 | 3 | 60.0% | 2 | 40.0% |
| Newfoundland | 0 | 0 | 0.0% | 0 | 0.0% |
| North-West Territories | 0 | 0 | 0.0% | 0 | 0.0% |
| Yukon | 0 | 0 | 0.0% | 0 | 0.0% |
| Total | 31 | 25 | 80.6% | 6 | 19.4% |

== See also ==
- List of Supreme Court of Canada cases
- List of House of Lords cases

== Sources ==
- British and Irish Legal Information Institute: Privy Council Decisions
