= Nathaniel Edward Kindersley =

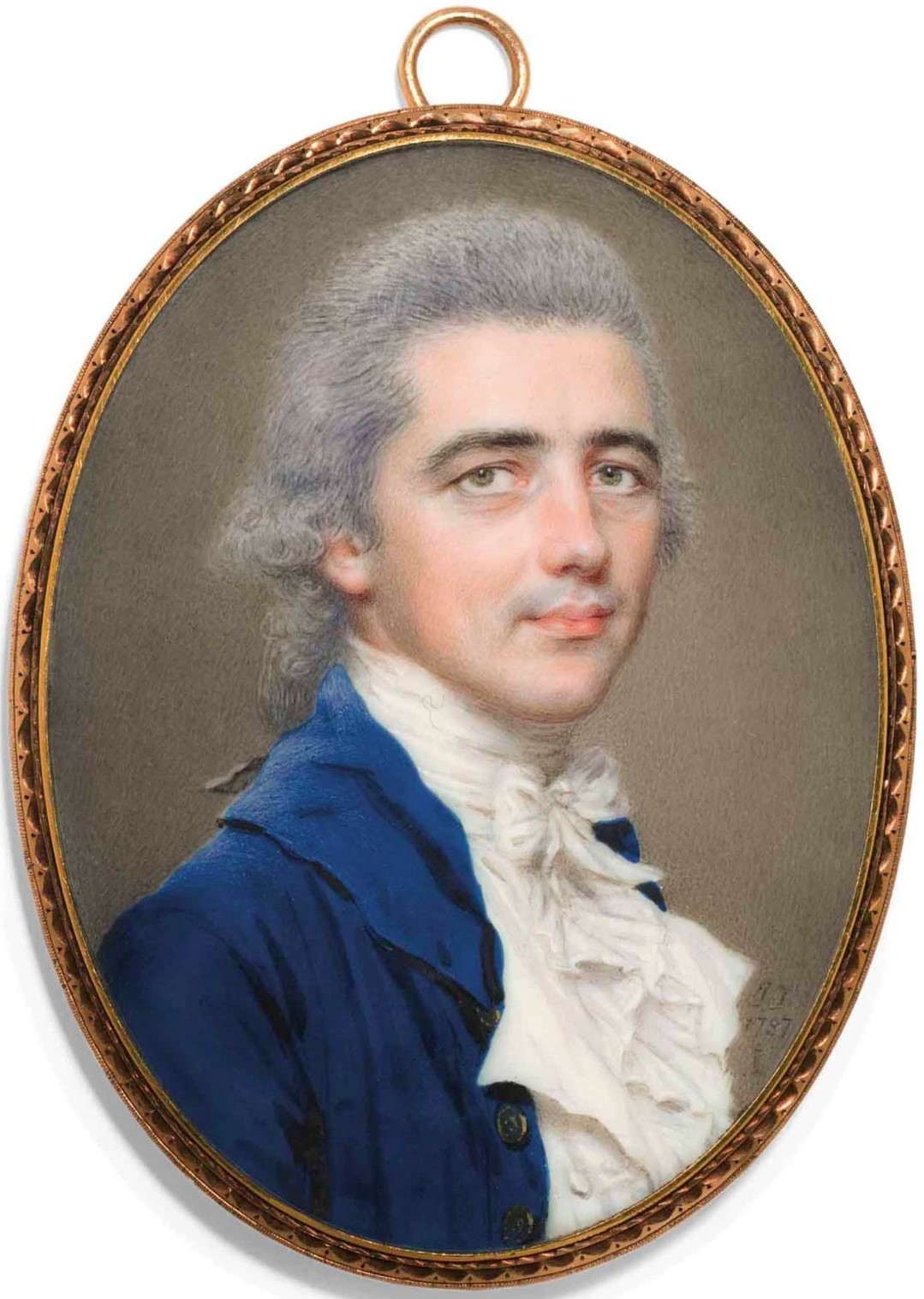
- 1787 portrait
- Born: 2 February 1763; Great Yarmouth, Norfolk, England
- Died: 16 February 1831 (aged 68); Little Marlow, Buckinghamshire, England
- Occupations: Officer, British East India Company
- Known for: First translator of Tirukkural into English
- Spouse: Hannah Butterworth
- Children: 2, including Richard Torin Kindersley
- Mother: Jemima Wickstead

Nathaniel Edward Kindersley (2 February 1763 – 16 February 1831) was an English civil service officer to the British East India Company. He is known for being the first translator of the Tirukkural into English in 1794.

== Family ==
Nathaniel Edward Kindersley was born to Nathaniel Kindersley and Jemima Wickstead at Great Yarmouth, Norfolk, England. He married Hannah Butterworth and they had two sons named Sir Richard Torin Kindersley (born 5 October 1792, died 22 October 1879) and Nathaniel William Kindersley (born 1794, died 3 December 1844).

He died on 16 February 1831 at the age of 68 at Little Marlow, Buckinghamshire, England.

== Works ==
Nathaniel Edward Kindersley published the first ever translation of the Tirukkural into English in a chapter titled 'Extracts from the Teroo-Vaulaver Kuddul, or, The Ocean of Wisdom' in his publication Specimens of Hindoo Literature in 1794. However, he translated only the first few chapters of Book I of the Kural text in prose.

== See also ==
- Tirukkural translations
- Tirukkural translations into English
- List of translators into English
