= Richard Torin Kindersley =

English lawyer and judge

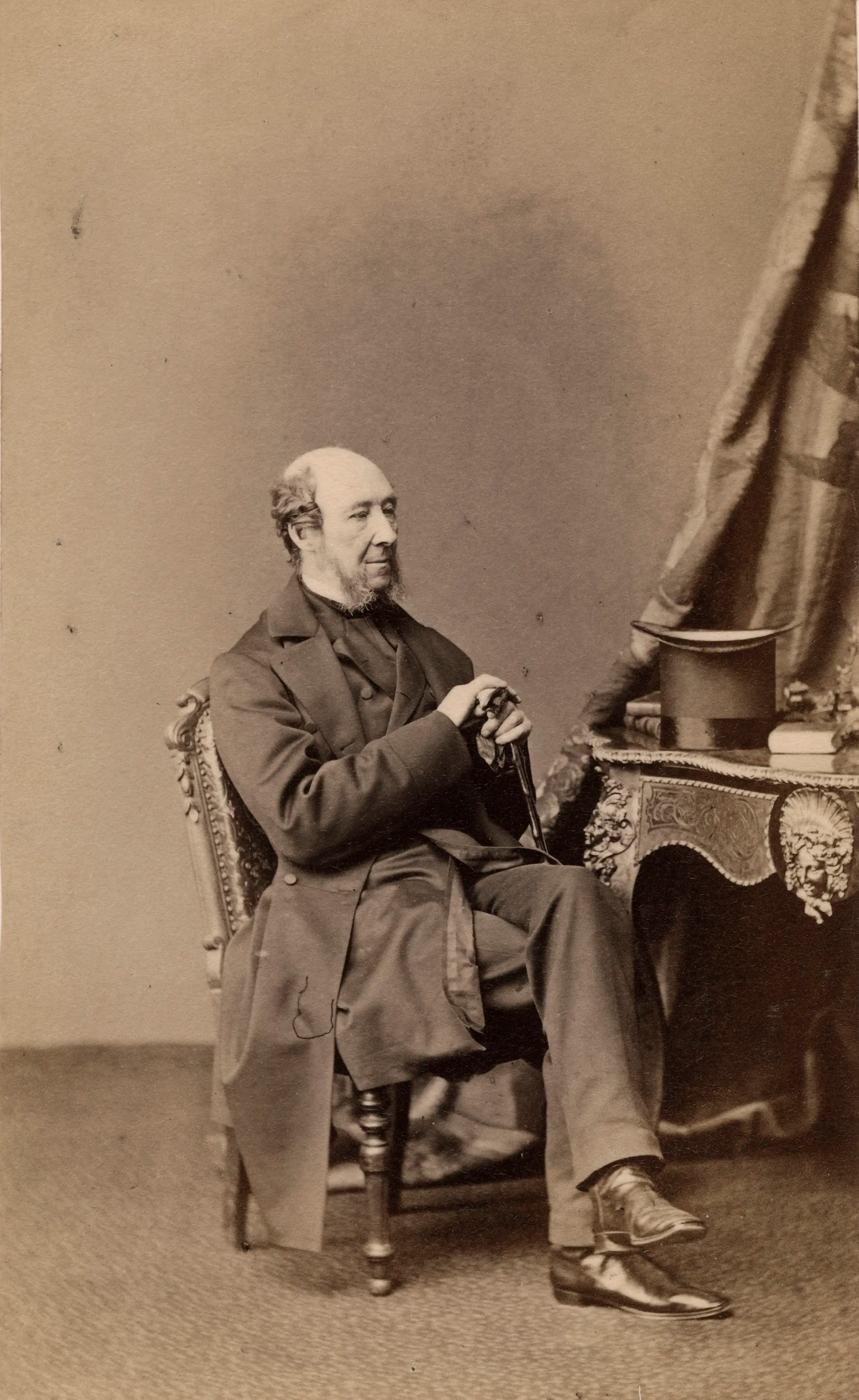
Portrait by John Jabez Edwin Mayall, c. 1865

Sir Richard Torin Kindersley (1792–1879) was an English lawyer and judge. He was born at Madras, India, eldest son of Nathaniel Edward Kindersley, and educated at Haileybury and Trinity College, Cambridge, becoming a fellow in 1815 and M.A. in 1817. He was called to the Bar (Lincoln's Inn) in 1818 and developed a Chancery practice. From 1847 to 1851, he served as Chancellor of the County Palatine of Durham. In 1848 he was appointed Master in Chancery, followed by an appointment as Vice-Chancellor in 1851. He had a reputation as a sound equity judge. He retired in 1866, but continued to sit on the Judicial Committee of the Privy Council.
