= List of Canadian appeals to the Judicial Committee of the Privy Council, 1870–1879 =

List of Canadian appeals to the JCPC (1870–1879)

This page lists all appeals to the Judicial Committee of the Privy Council from the Canadian courts, decided in the years 1870 to 1879.

From 1867 to 1949, the JCPC was the highest court of appeal for Canada (and, separately, for Newfoundland). During this period, its decisions on Canadian appeals were binding precedent on all Canadian courts, including the Supreme Court of Canada. Any decisions from this era that the Supreme Court of Canada has not overruled since gaining appellate supremacy in 1949 remain good law, and continue to bind all Canadian courts other than the Supreme Court.

The Parliament of Canada abolished appeals to the JCPC of criminal cases in 1933 and civil cases in 1949. Ongoing cases that had begun before those dates remained appealable to the JCPC. The final JCPC ruling on a Canadian case was rendered in 1959, in Ponoka-Calmar Oils v Wakefield.

== Case list ==
Case name	Citation	Subject (Exact Text from Judgment)	Judges (Author of decision in bold)	Appeal Allowed or Dismissed	On Appeal from
Boston and others v. Lelièvre and others	[1870] UKPC 1	"Their Lordships are not insensible to the importance of this case. At the same time they feel that they would not act rightly if they were to overrule the unanimous judgment of the Court below, upon a question of this nature, unless they were perfectly satisfied that the Judges had committed an error in refusing the exercise of their Appellate jurisdiction."	Lord Westbury; Sir James W. Colvile; Sir Joseph Napier	Appeal dismissed	Quebec Court of Queen's Bench (Appeal Side)
Young and Knight v. Lambert	[1870] UKPC 5	"In this case the Respondent claims the benefit of a seizure of goods, under a writ of fieri facias, issued on a Judgment recovered by him against Messrs. Maxwell and Stevenson, of Quebec, merchants. The writ was issued on the 30th May, 1865, and certain goods, alleged to be the property of Messrs. Maxwell and Stevenson, were seized under the writ by the Sheriff. The Appellants opposed the execution on the ground that by a contract in writing, bearing date the 19th August, 1864, the property of Maxwell and Stevenson in the goods in question was conveyed to them, and an authority to sell expressly conferred by Maxwell and Stevenson for the purpose of securing repayment of advances made by the Appellants on the faith of this contract; and as repayment had not been made, that the seizure under the writ should be set aside."	Lord Westbury; Sir James W. Colvile; Sir Joseph Napier	Appeal allowed	Quebec Court of Queen's Bench (Appeal Side)
Quebec Marine Insurance Company v. Commercial Bank of Canada	[1870] UKPC 18	"This is an Appeal from the Court of Queen's Bench in Canada, and the question to be determined is, whether or not the Appellants, who are the underwriters upon a policy of insurance, are, in the events that have happened, liable for the loss of the vessel insured by that policy?"	Lord Penzance; Sir William Erle; Lord Justice Giffard	Appeal allowed	Quebec Court of Queen's Bench (Appeal Side)
Nye v. Macdonald	[1870] UKPC 40	"In this case the Appellant, about twenty-one years ago, brought an action in the Courts of Lower Canada against the Respondent, for the recovery of a lot of land which is described in the pleadings. The Appellant claimed title to that lot under a grant originally made to a person of the name of John Rankin, and proposed to deduce his title from that John Rankin."	Lord Cairns; Sir James W. Colvile; Sir Joseph Napier	Appeal dismissed	Quebec Court of Queen's Bench (Appeal Side)
Morrison v. Dambourgès	[1871] UKPC 24	"This is an Appeal from the Court of Queen's Bench of the province of Quebec, in Canada. That Court sustained a Judgment which had been given by what is called the Superior Court, and from both these Judgments the Appeal is now prosecuted to their Lordships."	Lord Romilly, Master of the Rolls; Sir James W. Colvile; Sir Robert Phillimore, Judge of the High Court of Admiralty	Appeal dismissed	Quebec Court of Queen's Bench (Appeal Side)
Wardle v. Bethune	[1872] UKPC 10	"This was an appeal from the Judgment of the Court of Queen's Bench of Lower Canada at Montreal, in an action that arose out of a contract for building the new Cathedral church of that city."	Sir James W. Colvile; Sir Joseph Napier; Sir John Stuart; Sir Montague E. Smith	Appeal dismissed	Quebec Court of Queen's Bench (Appeal Side)
The Honourable Robert Jones v. The Stanstead Shefford and Chambly Railway Company	[1872] UKPC 13	This is an Appeal from a Judgment of the Court of Queen's Bench of Lower Canada, affirming a decision of the Superior Court of that Province, dismissing the Appellant's action. Whatever may be the precise technical nature of this action, it is plain that both in its substance and form it is founded on a supposed wrong done by the Railway Company to the Appellant in the erection of a Railway Bridge over the River Richelieu, by which he alleges that certain rights, conferred upon him by Statute as the owner of a Bridge over that River, have been unlawfully infringed.	Sir James W. Colvile; Sir Robert Phillimore, Judge of the High Court of Admiralty; Sir Montague E. Smith; Sir Robert P. Collier	Appeal dismissed	Quebec Court of Queen's Bench (Appeal Side)
Migneault v. Malo	[1872] UKPC 15	"This is an Appeal from a Judgment of the Court of Queen's Bench for the Province of Quebec, which reversed the Judgment of the Superior Court for Lower Canada. The litigation relates to the execution of a will and the following short statement of facts is necessary."	Sir James W. Colvile; Sir Robert Phillimore, Judge of the High Court of Admiralty; Sir Montague E. Smith; Sir Robert P. Collier	Appeal allowed	Quebec Court of Queen's Bench (Appeal Side)
Painchaud and others v. Hudon and others	[1872] UKPC 25	"The suit in which the decree under appeal was made was brought by the Respondents, who are traders in Canada under the firm of Hudon and Company, against the representatives of a M. Laurent. It was brought to recover a balance of $5,159 as the balance due upon four different promissory notes, three of which were made by M. Laurent in his lifetime, and one of which was made by one of his representatives after his death in favour of Hudon and Company."	Sir James W. Colvile; Sir Montague E. Smith; Sir Robert P. Collier	Appeal dismissed	Quebec Court of Queen's Bench (Appeal Side)
McLaren and another v. Murphy and another	[1872] UKPC 63	"This was an Appeal from the Court of Queen's Bench in Canada, reversing the decision of the Superior Court in favour of the Plaintiffs (the Respondents). The action was brought by the Respondents, who are merchants in Quebec, against the Defendants (the Appellants) also merchants in Quebec, to recover damages for the non-delivery of timber under a contract, which is in these terms ..."	Sir James W. Colvile; Sir Montague E. Smith; Sir Robert P. Collier	Appeal allowed	Quebec Court of Queen's Bench (Appeal Side)
Dame Marie Louise Herse and another v. Joseph Dufaux and others	[1872] UKPC 87	"In the year 1825 M. Pierre Roy, then of Montreal, by a notarial instrument dated the 21st of May, 1825, acknowledged and declared that he had made a donation by act inter vivos of a certain piece of land situate in one of the suburbs of Montreal, whereon five house had then been built, the rest consisting of meadow, orchard, and garden ground."	Sir James W. Colvile; Sir Barnes Peacock; Sir Montague E. Smith; Sir Robert P. Collier	Appeal dismissed	Quebec Court of Queen's Bench (Appeal Side)
Redpath and others v. Allan and others (ship "Hibernian")	[1872] UKPC 89	"This is an Appeal from a Decree of the Judge of the Vice Admiralty Court of Lower Canada, in a cause of damage brought by the owner of a certain cargo laden on board of two barges, against the steamship 'Hibernian'."	Sir James W. Colvile; Sir Robert Phillimore, Judge of the High Court of Admiralty; Sir Barnes Peacock; Sir Montague E. Smith; Sir Robert P. Collier	Appeal dismissed	Vice Admiralty Court of Lower Canada
Burstall and others v. Baptist	[1873] UKPC 2	"In this case the question is extremely short and simple, depending on the construction of a clause in the agreement made upon the dissolution of a partnership between Mr. Thomas Gordon and Mr. Baptist the Respondent."	Sir Barnes Peacock; Sir Montague E. Smith; Sir Robert P. Collier	Appeal allowed	Quebec Court of Queen's Bench
Hamilton and Milton Road Company v. The Corporation of the Town of Dundas	[1873] UKPC 16	"This is an Appeal from an Order of the Court of Error and Appeal of Ontario in Canada, dated the 7th day of September, 1870, varying a Decree of the Court of Chancery for the Province of Ontario, dated the 26th of January, 1870, and made on the hearing of a Cause wherein the Respondents were Plaintiffs, and the Appellants, with others, were Defendants."	Sir Barnes Peacock; Sir Montague E. Smith; Sir Robert P. Collier	Appeal dismissed	Ontario Court of Error and Appeal
Charles Leclère and others v. Jean Louis Beaudry	[1873] UKPC 19	"The late M. Pierre Leclère, the Appellant's testator, having obtained judgment against a Mr. Short for 50l., the price of a piece of ground, part of an orchard in Montreal, he had sold to him, the Sheriff seized the ground in execution. The Respondent (Beaudry) filed an opposition to the seizure as purchaser of the interest of person entitled to a share of the orchard under a deed of gift, and he sought to annul a previous sale made to Pierre Leclère himself, as well as the subsale by Leclère to Short."	Lord Justice James; Sir Barnes Peacock; Lord Justice Mellish; Sir Montague E. Smith	Appeal allowed	Quebec Court of Queen's Bench (Appeal Side)
Torrance and others v. The Bank of British North America	[1873] UKPC 23	"This is an Appeal from a decision of the Court of Queen's Bench in Canada, by which they affirmed the Judgment of the Court below there, in which it was held that the Bank of British North America were entitled to recover a sum of 10,000 dollars and interest against Messrs. Torrance and Company."	Sir James W. Colvile; Sir Barnes Peacock; Lord Justice Mellish; Sir Montague E. Smith; Sir Robert P. Collier	Appeal dismissed	Quebec Court of Queen's Bench (Appeal Side)
Our Sovereign Lady the Queen v Edward Coote	[1873] UKPC 26, (1873), LR 4 PC 599	"Edward Coote (the Respondent) was convicted of arson, subject to a question of law reserved by Mr. Justice Badgley (the Judge who presided at the trial) for the consideration of the Appeal side of the Court of Queen's Bench, in pursuance of cap. 77, sec. 57 of the Consolidated Statutes of Lower Canada."	Sir James W. Colvile; Sir Barnes Peacock; Lord Justice Mellish; Sir Montague E. Smith; **Sir Robert P. Collier**	Appeal allowed	Quebec Court of Queen's Bench (Appeal Side)
Browning v. The Provincial Insurance Company	[1873] UKPC 38	"This is an Appeal from a judgment of the Court of Queen's Bench for Lower Canada, affirming a Judgment of the Superior Court for the Province, which dismissed the Appellant's suit. The action was brought on a contract of insurance made with the respondents on 1,063 barrels of flour shipped in the schooner 'Babineau and Gaudry,' on a voyage from Montreal to St. John's, Newfoundland."	Sir James W. Colvile; Sir Barnes Peacock; Sir Montague E. Smith; Sir Robert P. Collier	Appeal allowed	Quebec Court of Queen's Bench (Appeal Side)
McConnell v. Murphy and others	[1873] UKPC 40	This is an action brought by the Plaintiff, (the Appellant,) who is engaged in the lumber trade and resides in Ottawa, against the Respondents, who are merchants at Quebec, for not accepting a quantity of timber under a contract of sale. The defence made to the action was, that the timber tendered was not in compliance with the contract, and therefore that the Defendant (the Respondent) had a right to reject it.	Sir James W. Colvile; Sir Robert Phillimore; Sir Montague E. Smith; Sir Robert P. Collier	Appeal allowed	Quebec Court of Queen's Bench (Appeal Side)
William McLean v. Alexander McKay	[1873] UKPC 47	"This is an Appeal from a judgment of the Supreme Court of Judicature for the county of Halifax in Nova Scotia, which reversed the decree of the Judge in Equity in favour of the Appellant, who was the Plaintiff in the suit below. The judges in the Supreme Court were divided in opinion. The Court consisted of five judges, of whom the Judge in Equity was one. The four judges who heard the cause for the first time were divided in opinion; but the learned Judge in Equity, having changed his own view of the case, created the majority of the Court which reversed his own decree. Their Lordships regret that the learned judge should have found occasion to change the opinion to which he had originally come, for after full discussion of the case their Lordships are of opinion that his first judgment was right in its reasoning, and sound in its conclusion."	Sir James W. Colvile; Sir Barnes Peacock; Sir Montague E. Smith	Appeal allowed	Supreme Court of Nova Scotia
Platt and another v. Burstall and another	[1873] UKPC 68	"The Respondents in this case are timber merchants, carrying on business at Quebec. The Appellants, though also described as merchants carrying on business at Quebec, appear in this transaction as persons engaged in the business of lumberers in the province of Ontario. The facts which led to the suit are short and simple, however difficult the questions which arise out of them may be. It appears that in the month of July 1870 the Appellants where bringing down the St. Lawrence two rafts of timber, of which, one, consisting of six drams, had arrived at Cape Rouge on or before the 2nd July. The Respondents being minded to deal with them for this timber, sent a culler, of the name of Gurry, to examine that raft; and upon the report which he made to them, they, on the 4th July 1870, entered into the written contract, upon which the action was afterwards brought. It is unnecessary for the present to consider particularly the terms of the contract. It contained no express guarantee for the quality of the timber, other than such as might be implied from the article providing for the rejection of certain pieces of timber falling within the description of culls, from the stipulation that all the wood should be of certain dimensions, and that the elm wood should be all rock or hard grey."	Sir James W. Colvile; Sir Barnes Peacock; Sir Montague E. Smith; Sir Robert P. Collier	Appeal dismissed	Quebec Court of Queen's Bench (Appeal Side)
Chaudière Gold Mining Company of Boston v. Desbarats and Others	[1873] UKPC 74	"This is an appeal from a judgment of the Court of Queen's Bench for Lower Canada, affirming a judgment of the Superior Court of the Province, which dismissed the Appellant's action." "The action was brought by them, as vendees of mining property in Lower Canada, on an alleged warranty of title, not against Foley, their immediate vendor, but against the respondents as the representatives of Foley's vendor, George Desbarats, who was, as they allege, liable as arrière-garant (remote warrantor), by virtue of Article 126 of Code of Civil Procedure."	Sir James W. Colvile; Sir Barnes Peacock; Sir Montague E. Smith; Sir Robert P. Collier	Appeal dismissed	Quebec Court of Queen's Bench (Appeal Side)
Silvanus Morton v. Jabesh Show	[1873] UKPC 85	"The question in this case is, whether the rule Nisi for a new trial ought to have been made absolute or not; and that depends upon the construction of the agreement of the 18th November 1800, and the ruling of the Chief Justice upon that subject."	Sir James W. Colvile; Sir Barnes Peacock; Sir Montague E. Smith; Sir Robert P. Collier	Appeal allowed	Supreme Court of Nova Scotia
Des Barres and another v. Shey	[1873] UKPC 90	"This is an Appeal from the Supreme Court of Halifax in an action of ejectment brought by the Appellant (Mr. Justice Des Barres) to recover 168 acres of land, designated as lot 81, in the township of Falmouth, Nova Scotia."	Sir James W. Colvile; Sir Barnes Peacock; Sir Montague Smith; Sir Robert P. Collier	Appeal dismissed	Supreme Court of Nova Scotia
William Muir et al v. James Muir	[1873] UKPC 95	"The questions to be determined on this appeal arise on the will of Ebenezer Muir, late of Montreal, who died on the 12th of January, 1866. The instrument, which bears date the 23rd of May, 1857, is made in notarial form; and the construction of its provisions, and the effect to be given to them, must, as both sides admit, be governed by the law of Lower Canada."	Sir James W. Colvile; Sir Barnes Peacock; Sir Montague E. Smith; Sir Robert P. Collier	Appeal dismissed	Quebec Court of Queen's Bench (Appeal Side)
The Lindsay Petroleum Company v. Hurd and others	[1874] UKPC 2	"The Court of Error and Appeal of Ontario does not appear to have differed from the two Courts below so far as the substantial merits of this case were concerned. The point on which three judges of the Court of Appeal, who had not been concerned in the earlier stages of the case, differed from two other judges who had taken part in those earlier stages, and on which they founded their alteration of the judgment of the Vice-Chancellor and the Chancellor, was this, that they thought the Plaintiffs had lost their option to rescind the entire contract by the delay which had taken place in the assertion of their right, accompanied, as we must suppose they considered themselves entitled to presume, with knowledge sufficient to make that delay material."	Earl of Selborne, Lord Chancellor; Sir Barnes Peacock; Sir Montague E. Smith; Sir Robert P. Collier	Appeal allowed	Ontario Court of Error and Appeal
Andrew Elliott v. Jean Louis Beaudry	[1874] UKPC 18	"The substantial questions in the present Appeal were decided by their Lordships in a former Appeal which came before them from the Court of Queen's Bench for Lower Canada, in a case in which Charles Leclère was the Appellant, and Beaudry, the present Respondent, was Respondent there. The present suit was brought by Beaudry, claiming to be entitled to a small share of two lots in an orchard, which he had purchased from the children of Benjamin Castonguay."	Sir James W. Colvile; Sir Montague E. Smith; Sir Robert P. Collier	Appeal allowed	Quebec Court of Queen's Bench(Appeal Side)
Mackay and another v. The Commercial Bank of New Brunswick and others	[1874] UKPC 20	"The most material facts in this case may be thus stated:— "Mr. Lingley, a timber merchant, of St. John's, New Brunswick, had for some years before June 1868 been in the habit of consigning cargoes of deals to the Messrs. Mackay (the Plaintiffs), who are timber brokers in Liverpool, and of drawing bills upon them, which he indorsed to the Defendants, who are an Incorporated Bank, carrying on business at St. John's; he also from time to time drew upon the Plaintiffs bills for the accommodation of the Bank, for the payment of which the Bank sometimes gave guarantees to the Plaintiffs."	Sir James W. Colvile; Sir Barnes Peacock; Sir Montague E. Smith; Sir Robert P. Collier	Appeal allowed	Supreme Court of New Brunswick
Richer v. Voyer and other	[1874] UKPC 41	"This is an action brought by the heirs of Madame Voyer against M. Richer, the Appellant, to recover a sum of 2,000 dollars, deposited on behalf of Madame Voyer in the Banque du Peuple of Montreal, upon a Certificate of Deposit payable to her order, and which sum the bank paid to the Appellant after Madame Voyer's death."	Sir James W. Colvile; Sir Barnes Peacock; Sir Montague E. Smith; Sir Robert P. Collier	Appeal dismissed	Quebec Court of Queen's Bench (Appeal Side)
Provincial Insurance Company of Canada v. Leduc	[1874] UKPC 50, LR 6 PC 224	"The Respondent, Joel Leduc, is the Plaintiff, and the Appellants, the Provincial Insurance Company of Canada, are the Defendants in a suit brought in the Superior Court for Lower Canada, district of Montreal, upon a policy of insurance upon the body, tackle, apparel, and other furniture of the schooner 'Babineau Gaudry'."	Sir James W. Colvile; **Sir Barnes Peacock**; Sir Montague E. Smith; Sir Robert P. Collier	Appeal dismissed	Quebec Court of Queen's Bench (Appeal Side)
L'Union St. Jacques de Montreal v. Dame Julie Bélisle	[1874] UKPC 53, LR 6 PC 31	"The sole question in this Appeal is this,— whether the subject matter of the Provincial Act, the 33rd Victoria, cap. 58, is one of those which by the 91st section of the Dominion Act are reserved exclusively for legislation by the Dominion Legislature. The scheme of the 91st and 92nd sections is this. By the 91st section some matters,—and their Lordships may do well to assume, for the argument's sake, that they are all matters except those afterwards dealt with by the 92nd section—their Lordships do not decide it, but for the argument's sake they will assume it,—certain matters, being upon that assumption all those which are not mentioned in the 92nd section, are reserved for the exclusive legislation of the Parliament of Canada, called the Dominion Parliament; but beyond controversy there are certain other matters, not only not reserved for the Dominion Parliament, but assigned to the exclusive power and competency of the provincial legislature in each province."	**Lord Selborne**; Sir James W. Colvile; Sir Barnes Peacock; Sir Montague E. Smith; Sir Robert P. Collier	Appeal allowed	Quebec Court of Queen's Bench (Appeal Side)
King v. Tunstall and others	[1874] UKPC 57, LR 6 PC 55	"Their Lordships have listened with great attention and interest to the very able arguments which have been addressed to them by both the learned counsel in support of the Appellant's case. Their Lordships will assume for the purposes of this Appeal that the old law was exactly as stated by the learned counsel; that is to say, that according to the Coutume de Paris, which was planted in Canada by royal authority as the law of Canada under the French dominion, the gift in question to Plenderleath would be an absolutely null and void gift, by reason of the doctrines of that law as to adulterine bastardy."	**Lord Justice James**; Sir Montague E. Smith; Sir Robert P. Collier	Appeal dismissed	Quebec Court of Queen's Bench (Appeal Side)
Evanturel v. Evanturel	[1874] UKPC 58, LR 6 PC 1	"The Appellant is the son, and the female Respondent a daughter, of Dame Marie Anne Bédard, who, being then the widow of François Evanturel, died on the 18th of November, 1863. By her solemn testament, passed between two notaries, and dated the 18th of May, 1861, she gave the usufruct of all her estate to her son, the Appellant, for his life, but 'à la charge,' or subject to the obligation of paying a life annuity of 25l. to each of her four daughters, and two smaller annuities to her sisters. Subject to this disposition the testatrix bequeathed 'la propriété de ses dits biens meubles et immeubles' to the children born and to be born of the marriage of the Appellant with his then wife, equally, constituting them her 'légataires universels en propriété'."	**Sir James W. Colvile**; Sir Barnes Peacock; Sir Montague E. Smith; Sir Robert P. Collier	Appeal allowed	Quebec Court of Queen's Bench (Appeal Side)
Dame Henriette Brown v. Les Curé et Marguilliers de l'Œuvre et Fabrique de la Paroisse de Montréal	[1874] UKPC 70, LR 6 PC 157	"This is an Appeal from a Judgment of the Court of Queen's Bench for the Province of Quebec, in Canada, confirming a Judgment of the Court of Review, which latter reversed a Judgment of the Superior Court in First Instance. The question which was the subject of these different Judgments related to the burial of the remains of Joseph Guibord, one of Her Majesty's Roman Catholic subjects, who died at Montreal on the 18th of November, 1869."	Lord Selborne; Sir James W. Colvile; **Sir Robert Phillimore**; Sir Barnes Peacock; Sir Montague E. Smith; Sir Robert P. Collier	Appeal allowed	Quebec Court of Queen's Bench (Appeal Side)
The Honourable John J.C. Abbott et al. v. John Fraser et al.	[1874] UKPC 72, LR 6 PC 96	"The questions in this Appeal relate to the validity of a devise in the Will of Mr. Hugh Fraser, a merchant of Montreal, by which he devoted the bulk of his property, moveable and immoveable, to the purpose of establishing at Montreal an Institution, "to be called 'The Fraser Institute,' to be composed of a free public library, museum, and gallery"."	Lord Justice James; Sir Barnes Peacock; **Sir Montague E. Smith**; Sir Robert P. Collier	Appeal allowed	Quebec Court of Queen's Bench (Appeal Side)
Maher v. Town Council of Portland	[1874] UKPC 83	"Their Lordships have been unable to entertain any doubt whatever upon this question. The point is a very short point, and depends upon the construction of a very few words in the Act constituting the Dominion of Canada. The question alone to which we desired counsel to confine themselves, as lying at the root of the whole thing, is whether the schools which existed in New Brunswick under the Public Schools Act, were denominational or not."	Sir James W. Colvile; Lord Justice Mellish; **Lord Justice James**; Sir Montague E. Smith; Sir Robert Collier	Appeal dismissed	Supreme Court of New Brunswick
Pierre Guyon dit Lemoine v. Hardoin Lionais	[1874] UKPC 65	"A Court of Justice will not give its aid to a person seeking to set aside his own solemn deed of sale, if it appears that he has acquiesced in it for years, lying by, until, by circumstances and the expenditure of capital, the subject matter of the sale has greatly increased in value, and new interests have been created in it. He must sue promptly or explain the delay."	Sir James W. Colvile; Sir Barnes Peacock; Sir Montague E. Smith; Sir Robert Collier	Appeal dismissed	Quebec Court of Queen's Bench (Appeal Side)
The Lancashire Insurance Company v. Chapman and others	[1875] UKPC 10	"In this case their Lordships do not think it necessary to hear the Respondents, as the case has been very fully gone into in the arguments that have been brought forward on the part of the Appellant, and the evidence in the case very fully adverted to. This is an appeal against a judgment pronounced by the Court of Queen's Bench for Lower Canada, reversing a judgment previously pronounced by a single judge of the Superior Court of that province."	Sir James W. Colvile; Sir Montague E. Smith; Sir Robert P. Collier; Sir Henry S. Keating	Appeal dismissed	Quebec Court of Queen's Bench (Appeal Side)
Henry J.S. King v. Alfred Pinsoneault	[1875] UKPC 14, LR 6 PC 245	"In order to make this case intelligible a short narrative is necessary. General Napier Christie Burton, who possessed property in England and in Lower Canada, made his will on the 20th December, 1834, the provisions of which material to the cause are as follows:— He gave and bequeathed the lease of the house in England, in which he then resided, and all his household furniture, plate, &c., and all his other effects, together with all cash in the house at the time of his decease, together with all moneys due to him..."	Sir James W. Colvile; Sir Barnes Peacock; Sir Montague E. Smith; **Sir Robert P. Collier**	Appeal allowed in part	Quebec Court of Queen's Bench
Dow and others v. Black and others	[1875] UKPC 17, LR 6 PC 272	"This is an Appeal against an order of the Supreme Court of the province of New Brunswick, making absolute a rule nisi that had been granted, and ordering that 'the assessment made upon the lower district of the parish of St. Stephen, in the county of Charlotte, under and by virtue of a warrant of assessment issued to the assessors of the parish of St. Stephen by the general sessions of the peace in and for the county of Charlotte on the 14th day of April 1871, directing the said assessors to assess upon the lower district of St. Stephen the sum of 958 dollars and 50 cents for payment of interest upon debentures issued under the Act of Assembly, 33rd Victoria, cap. 47, intituled 'An Act to authorize the issuing of debentures on the credit of the lower district of the parish of St. Stephen, in the county of Charlotte,' and the said warrant and all proceedings upon which the said assessment is based be absolutely quashed'."	**Sir James W. Colvile**; Lord Justice James; Lord Justice Mellish; Sir Montague E. Smith	Appeal allowed	Supreme Court of New Brunswick
Les Curé et Marguilliers de la Paroisse de Verchères v. La Corporation de la Paroisse de Verchères	[1875] UKPC 18, LR 6 PC 330	"The village of Verchères, situate within the limits of the parish of Verchères, was, in the year 1857, erected into an unincorporated village, in the manner prescribed in the Consolidated Statutes of Lower Canada."	Lord Hatherley; Sir James W. Colvile; **Sir Robert Phillimore**; Sir Barnes Peacock; Sir Montague E. Smith; Sir Robert P. Collier	Appeal dismissed	Quebec Court of Queen's Bench (Appeal Side)
John Whyte v. The Western Assurance Company	[1875] UKPC 19	"This is an Appeal from a judgment of the Court of Queen's Bench in Canada, affirming a judgment of the Superior Court. The action was on a policy of insurance against fire, brought in the name of Whyte, who was an official assignee of the effects of Davies, who was an insolvent, and who claimed as the assignee of the policy from one Clarke. There were pleas raising several defences, and according to the practice of the Court in Canada, that Court settled a number of questions on points of fact which were put to the jury at the trial, and their answers are before their Lordships."	Sir James W. Colvile; Lord Justice James; Lord Justice Mellish; Sir Montague E. Smith	Appeal dismissed	Quebec Court of Queen's Bench (Appeal Side)
Cobequid Marine Insurance Co. v. Barteaux	[1875] UKPC 25, LR 6 PC 319	"This was an action brought in Nova Scotia upon a policy of insurance affected with present Appellants in favour of the Respondents. It was a time policy for twelve months upon a vessel called the 'Foyle', which was a comparatively new vessel, being only three years old, and carrying somewhere about 400 tons. The Plaintiffs in the action below sought to make the insurers liable upon the ground of a total loss, and the total loss relied upon was the sale of the vessel under circumstances which, it was said, justified that sale, and so occasioned to the owners a total loss of the ship."	Sir James W. Colvile; Sir Barnes Peacock; Sir Montague E. Smith; Sir Robert P. Collier; **Sir Henry S. Keating**	Appeal allowed	Supreme Court of Nova Scotia
The European Assurance Society v. The Bank of Toronto	[1875] UKPC 30	"Their Lordships do not think it necessary to call upon the counsel for the Respondents." "In this case we are called upon to reverse the judgment of two Courts, namely, the Court of Review and the Court of Queen's Bench, who gave judgment for the Plaintiffs. It must be admitted that there was one judge in the first Court (the superior Court), Mr. Justice Monk, who held a contrary opinion, holding that the Defendants, were not liable; and that in the ultimate appellate Court in Canada, the Court of Queen's Bench, Mr. Justice Badgeley, one of the judges, differed in opinion from the majority; so that in fact there were two judges out of seven in favour of the Defendants, against five who were in favour of the Plaintiffs. The question is whether the loss sustained by allowing the over-drafts of Messrs. Nichols and Robinson was a loss within the meaning of the policy of assurance which the Bank of Toronto had obtained from the Defendants, the European Assurance Society."	Sir James W. Colvile; Sir Barnes Peacock; Sir Montague E. Smith; Sir Robert P. Collier; Sir Henry S. Keating	Appeal dismissed	Quebec Court of Queen's Bench (Appeal Side)
The Bank of British North America v. Samuel Strong	[1876] UKPC 10	"The Defendants in this case are the Appellants. They appeal against a rule discharging a rule nisi obtained by them to set aside a verdict for the Plaintiff and for a new trial. The action was brought by Samuel Strong against the Bank of British North America. The declaration contains six counts."	Sir James W. Colvile; Sir Barnes Peacock; Sir Montague E. Smith; Sir Robert P. Collier	Appeal allowed	Nova Scotia Supreme Court
Tully v. Richardson and others (the Norma)	[1876] UKPC 20	"This is an Appeal from a Decree of the judge of the Vice-Admiralty Court at Quebec in a suit for damages, the consequence of a collision between two vessels, the 'James Seed,' a sailing vessel, and the 'Norma,' steamship.	Sir James W. Colvile; Sir Robert Phillimore; Sir Montague E. Smith; Sir Robert P. Collier	Appeal dismissed	Vice-Admiralty Court of Quebec
Moore and another v. Harris	[1876] UKPC 23	"This is an Appeal from a Judgment of the Quebec Court of Queen's Bench, affirming a Decree of the Superior Court with dismissed the Plaintiff's action." "The Appellants, who are merchants in Toronto, brought the action against the Respondent, the owner of the steamship 'Medway,' one of a line of steamers between London and Montreal, for the value of the damage alleged to have been done to 306 packages of tea on the voyage from London to Montreal."	Sir James W. Colvile; Sir Barnes Peacock; Sir Montague E. Smith; Sir Robert P. Collier	Appeal dismissed	Quebec Court of Queen's Bench (Appeal Side)
Pierre Gravel v. Pierre P. Martin et al.	[1876] UKPC 25	"On the 18th of June 1869 the Defendant, as a clerk or servant of the Plaintiffs, was entrusted by them with a considerable sum of money for the purpose of carrying it to England to make purchases for them, and to pay debts which they owed in England."	Sir James W. Colvile; Sir Barnes Peacock; Sir Montague E. Smith; Sir Robert P. Collier	Appeal dismissed	Quebec Court of Queen's Bench (Appeal Side)
Mayor, &c., of Montreal v. Drummond	[1876] UKPC 27	"The action which gives occasion to this Appeal was brought by the Honourable Lewis Drummond (the respondent) against the Municipal Corporation of the City of Montreal (the Appellants), for damage sustained in consequence of the Corporation having closed one end of St. Felix Street in Montreal."	Sir James W. Colvile; Sir Barnes Peacock; Sir Montague E. Smith; Sir Robert P. Collier	Appeal allowed	Quebec Court of Queen's Bench (Appeal Side)
William A. Robertson v. Peter Grant	[1876] UKPC 42	"This appeal comes before their Lordships under somewhat peculiar circumstances. Two persons of the name of Benjamin and Frederick Short carried on business in partnership at Halifax. Their father, William Short, appears to have had some business connection with them, but the nature and extent of that connection it is exceedingly difficult to arrive at. In 1865 a small ship called the 'Athalaska' was built for Benjamin Short, or at all events nominally for Benjamin Short, and he was registered as her sole owner. Almost immediately upon this he mortgaged the vessel to his father. Subsequently that mortgage appears to have been got rid of, and he again became the sole owner. He seems to have sold or mortgaged it again, but he became the sole owner again at the time material to the present inquiry."	Sir Barnes Peacock; Sir Montague E. Smith; Sir Robert P. Collier	Appeal dismissed	Nova Scotia Supreme Court
Théberge v. Laudry	[1876] UKPC 48	"The Petitioner in this case states that he was a candidate at an election held in July 1875, in the Province of Quebec, for the office of member to represent the electoral district of Montmanier in the Legislative Assembly of the Province, and that he was declared duly elected; but that after the election a petition was presented by certain electors against the return of the Petitioner, alleging that he had been guilty of corrupt practices by himself and his agents, and praying that the seat might be declared vacant, and the Petitioner declared disqualified, in accordance with the provision of the Quebec Controverted Election Act."	**Lord Cairns, Lord Chancellor**; Sir Barnes Peacock; Sir Robert P. Collier; Sir Henry S. Keating	Appeal dismissed	Quebec Superior Court
The Mayor, Aldermen, and Citizens of the City of Montreal v. Thomas Brown and Jas. K. Springle	[1876] UKPC 49	"This is an Appeal from the judgment of the Court of Queen's Bench of Lower Canada (appeal side), delivered on the 20th September 1873, reversing, in favour of the present Respondent, the judgment of the Superior Court sitting at Montreal of September 17th, 1870, upon a petition of the Appellants."	Sir Barnes Peacock; Sir Robert P. Collier; Sir Henry S. Keating	Appeal dismissed	Quebec Court of Queen's Bench (Appeal Side)
Hamel and others v. Panet	[1876] UKPC 50	"This is a suit instituted in 1869 to set aside a notarial act which purports to have been passed on the 26th January 1855. The Judges in Canada have been very much divided in opinion upon the case; three of them in the whole, counting the Chief Justice who sat in the Superior Court which decided for the present Appellants, being against the suit, and three of them, constituting a majority in the Court of Appeal, in favour of the Plaintiff. The original judgment, therefore, which was against the Plaintiff, was reversed, and the appeal is from that judgment of reversal."	Lord Selborne; Sir Barnes Peacock; Sir Robert P. Collier; Sir James Hannen	Appeal allowed	Quebec Court of Queen's Bench (Appeal Side)
The Mississippi and Dominion Steamship Company of Liverpool, Limited, the owners of the steamship Quebec, v. John Hendry and Alexander Ferguson, the owners of the ship Princess Alexandra	[1876] UKPC 51	"This is an appeal from a decision of the learned Judge of the Vice-Admiralty Court of Lower Canada in a case of collision."	Sir Robert Phillimore; Sir Barnes Peacock; Sir Robert P. Collier	Appeal dismissed	Vice-Admiralty Court of Quebec
Wilson v. The Canada Shipping Company (the Lake St. Clair and the Underwriter)	[1877] UKPC 6	"This is an appeal from the Vice-Admiralty Court of Quebec in a case of collision which took place between twelve and one o’clock in the morning of the 26th of July in the year 1875. The place of the collision seems to have been off Cape Rosier, in the Gulf of St. Lawrence. The ships that collided were two large vessels, the 'Lake St. Clair,' an iron ship of 1,061 tons, with a general cargo and a crew of 31 hands, bound for Montreal, and the 'Underwriter,' a full-rigged ship of 1,481 tons, in ballast, with a crew of 23 hands, bound for Quebec. The nature of the damage inflicted was this,— the 'Lake St. Clair' was struck at about right angles, 60 feet from the stern on the starboard side abaft the main-rigging, the bow of the 'Underwriter' passing between her main topmost back stays and mainmast stays. Both these vessels were on tacks beating up the River St. Lawrence, and the learned Judge of the Court below, after consulting his nautical assessor, in a judgment which bears the marks of great pains and care, came to the conclusion that the 'Underwriter' was alone to blame for this collision. With that judgment their Lordships are unable wholly to concur.	Sir James W. Colvile; Sir Robert Phillimore; Sir Montague E. Smith; Sir Robert P. Collier	Appeal allowed	Vice-Admiralty Court of Quebec
Henry Atkinson v. Reverend Henry Usborne	[1877] UKPC 31	"In this case there is an appeal and cross appeal against the judgment of the Court of Queen's Bench of Canada in a suit brought by the Appellant, who was the Plaintiff below, against the respondent, to recover damages for breach of a contract for the sale of timber. The Plaintiffs are owners of saw mills near Quebec. The Defendant, the Rev. Henry Usborne, a clergyman living in England, was the owner of extensive 'limits' or tracts of pine forest in Canada, which were managed by George Purvis as his agent."	Sir James W. Colvile; Sir Barnes Peacock; Sir Montague E. Smith	Appeal allowed	Quebec Court of Queen's Bench (Appeal Side)
Minister and Trustees of St. Andrew's Church, Montreal v. James Johnston	[1877] UKPC 48	"This is an application for the exercise by Her Majesty of her prerogative for the purpose of allowing an appeal to be brought from a judgment of the Supreme Court of Canada. The circumstances under which that judgment was given are these: A person of the name of Johnston commenced an action in 1873 in the Superior Court of the district of Montreal against the present Petitioners, who are the minister and the trustees of St. Andrew's Church, Montreal. The object of that action was to recover damages for what may be called a disturbance in the occupation of a pew in the church. The declaration stated that the Plaintiff was lessee of a pew in St. Andrew's Church for several years, and a pew-holder under a byelaw made by the trustees of the church. The byelaw referred to is the 10th, and it provided that 'Any person who shall lease a pew from the trustees for one year and pay the rent in advance, shall be considered a pew-holder; the rents of pews and sittings are to be paid annually in advance from the first day of January, and are considered to be then due'."	Lord Cairns, Lord Chancellor; Sir James W. Colvile; Sir Barnes Peacock; Sir Montague E. Smith; Sir Robert P. Collier	Appeal dismissed	Supreme Court of Canada
Dame Harriet Morrison and others v. The Mayor, Aldermen, and citizens of the city of Montreal	[1877] UKPC 51	"Their Lordships are called upon in this Appeal to reverse two Judgments of the Court of Queen's Bench at Quebec with reference to the amount of compensation to be paid by the respondents, the Corporation of the City of Montreal, to the Appellants, as proprietors of certain lands expropriated for the purpose of forming a park, to be called Mount Royal Park."	Sir James W. Colvile; Sir Barnes Peacock; Sir Montague E. Smith; Sir Robert P. Collier	Appeal dismissed	Quebec Court of Queen's Bench
Kershaw v. Kirkpatrick and another	[1878] UKPC 4	"This was an action for money had and received, to which the general issue was pleaded. The question in the cause may be shortly stated to have been the appropriation of a payment, on which the Lower Court, and the Court of Queen's Bench, have found in favour of the Plaintiff."	Sir James W. Colvile; Sir Barnes Peacock; Sir Montague E. Smith; Sir Robert P. Collier	Sustained	Quebec Court of Queen's Bench
The Mayor and Council of Montreal v. Harrison Stephens	[1878] UKPC 5	"This is an appeal in a suit brought by Mr. Stephens against the mayor, aldermen, and citizens of Montreal, in which he prayed the Superior Court of declare void an assessment which had been made upon him as his share of the amount to be paid for certain lands which were taken for the purpose of improving the street called Little St. James Street, in the city of Montreal; he also prayed for damages to be awarded to him by reason of his having had his goods distrained under a warrant of distress for the amount of that assessment."	Sir James W. Colvile; Sir Barnes Peacock; Sir Montague E. Smith; Sir Robert P. Collier	Sustained	Quebec Court of Queen's Bench
Archibald v. Taylor	[1878] UKPC 10	"Their Lordships are of opinion that this case ought to be submitted to another jury. The declaration charges that 'the Defendants broke and entered certain land of the Plaintiff, situate at L'Ardoise, in the county of Richmond, known as the "Donald Matheson property", and also certain shops, stores, and other building being thereon, and seized, took, and carried away a large quantity of goods, wares, and chattels from the said stores, shops, and building, and destroyed the same'."	Sir James W. Colvile; Sir Barnes Peacock; Sir Montague E. Smith; Sir Robert P. Collier	Sustained	Nova Scotia Supreme Court
James Edwin Pim (owner of the Eliza Keith) v. John McIntyre (owner of the Langshaw)	[1878] UKPC 19	"This is an appeal from a judgment given by the learned Judge of the Vice-Admiralty Court of Quebec in a case of collision. The collision took place in the River St. Lawrence, between two places called Kamuraska and the Pilgrims, at about 11.30 on the evening of the 15th of August 1876. The vessels that came into collision were the 'Eliza Keith', a sailing vessel of 540 tons or thereabouts, and the steamer 'Landshaw', of the burden of 1186 tons. The parts of the vessels which came into collision were the jibboom and bowsprit of the 'Eliza Keith' with the mainmast of the 'Landshaw'."	Sir James W. Colvile; Sir Robert Phillimore; Sir Barnes Peacock; Sir Montague E. Smith; Sir Robert P. Collier	Sustained	Vice-Admiralty Court of the Province of Quebec
The Honourable Auguste Réal Angers, Attorney General for the Province of Quebec pro Domina Regina vs. The Queen Insurance Company	[1878] UKPC 33	"This is an appeal from a Judgment of the Court of Queen's Bench in Canada, affirming a Judgment of the Superior Court of the Province of Montreal. The Judgment appealed against was unanimous on one of the two points to which the Appeal relates, and was decided by four Judges against one on the other. The real decision was that the clauses of a statute of the Province of Quebec, 39th of the Queen, Chap. 7, which imposed a tax upon certain policies of assurance, and certain receipts or renewals, were not authorized by the Union Act of Canada, Nova Scotia, and New Brunswick, which entrusted the Province, or the Legislature of that Province, with certain powers. And the sole question their Lordships intend to consider is, whether or not the powers conferred by the 92nd section of the Act in question are sufficient to authorize the statute which is under consideration?"	Sir James W. Colvile; Sir Barnes Peacock; Sir Montague Smith; Sir Robert P. Collier; **Sir George Jessel, Master of the Rolls**	Sustained	Quebec Court of Queen's Bench
Les Sœurs Dames Hospitalières de St. Joseph de l’Hôtel Dieu de Montréal v. Middlemiss	[1878] UKPC 35	"This case has been argued with great learning and ability on both sides. The question however, between the parties is reducible within narrow limits; and that question having been very fully argued and their Lordships having had an opportunity of considering the authorities cited, they do not think it necessary to reserve their judgment."	Sir James W. Colvile; Sir Barnes Peacock; Sir Robert P. Collier	Sustained	Quebec Court of Queen's Bench
Dame Adelaide Catherine Aubert de Gaspé and others v. Bessener and others	[1878] UKPC 46	"The Appeals of which their Lordships have now to dispose were preferred to Her Majesty against the judgment of the Court of Queen's Bench in Canada, in six different suits. The case of the Plaintiffs, the relief prayed by them, the evidence given,— with some slight variations in that given on the part of the different Defendants,— and the ratio decidendi of the Court of Queen's Bench, being substantially the same in all the causes,—the Appeals were consolidated by the order of Her Majesty, and have accordingly been heard together upon one case for the Plaintiffs, the Appellants, and one common case for all the Defendants."	Sir James W. Colvile; Sir Barnes Peacock; Sir Montague E. Smith; Sir Robert P. Collier	Sustained	Quebec Court of Queen's Bench
Isaac Bartlett v. William P. Bartley & Co.	[1879] UKPC 12	"This Appeal arises out an action brought by the Plaintiffs, William P. Bartley and another, in which they sought to recover the sum of 4,000 dollars, alleged to be due to them as the last installment of a sum of 16,000 dollars which the Defendant Isaac Bartlett had agreed to pay for a compound screw propellers, and other articles which the Plaintiff had agreed to construct, make, and supply for a vessel of the Defendant, and also to recover the sum of 1,400 dollars for extras."	Sir James W. Colvile; Sir Barnes Peacock; Sir Montague E. Smith; Sir Robert P. Collier	Sustained	Quebec Court of Queen's Bench
Bell Corporation v. Quebec	[1879] UKPC 58	"This is an appeal from the judgment of the Quebec Court of Queen's Bench, which affirmed the judgment of the Superior Court of the Province, dismissing the Appellant's action. The action was brought for damages, and to obtain the demolition of a bridge, constructed by the Corporation of Quebec, across the Little River St. Charles, a tributary of the St. Lawrence, on the ground that the bridge obstructed the navigation of the river, and thereby caused damage to the Appellant, as the owner of riparian land."	Sir Barnes Peacock; Sir Montague E. Smith; Sir Robert P. Collier	Sustained	Quebec Court of Queen's Bench
Valin v Langlois	[1879] UKPC 68	"Their Lordships have carefully considered the able argument which they have heard from Mr. Benjamin, and they feel glad that so full an argument has been offered to them, because there can be no doubt that the matter is one of great importance. The petition is to obtain leave to appeal from two concurrent judgments of the Court of First Instance and of the Court of Appeal affirming the competency and validity of an Act of the Dominion Legislature of Canada. Nothing can be of more importance, certainly, than a question of that nature, and the subject-matter also, being the mode of determining election petitions in cases of controverted elections to seats in the Parliament of Canada, is beyond all doubt of the greatest importance."	Lord Selborne; Sir James W. Colvile; Sir Barnes Peacock; Sir Montague E. Smith; Sir Robert P. Collier	Leave to Appeal Denied	Supreme Court of Canada

== Summary by year and result ==
Year	Number of Cases	Appeal Allowed		Appeal Dismissed	
1870	4	2	50.0%	2	50.0%
1871	1	0	0.0%	1	100.0%
1872	7	2	28.6%	5	71.4%
1873	13	7	53.8%	6	46.2%
1874	12	7	58.3%	5	41.7%
1875	7	3	42.9%	4	57.1%
1876	10	3	30.0%	7	70%
1877	4	2	50.0%	2	50.0%
1878	7	0	0.0%	7	100.0%
1879	3	0	0.0%	3	100.0%
Total Cases	68	26	38.2%	42	61.8%
Yearly Averages	6.8	2.6		4.2	

== Summary by province and court appealed from ==
Province	Number of Appeals	On Appeal from Supreme Court of Canada		On Appeal from Provincial Courts	
Ontario	2	0	0.0%	2	100.0%
Quebec	56	2	3.6%	54	96.4%
Nova Scotia	6	0	0.0%	6	100.0%
New Brunswick	4	0	0.0%	4	100.0%
Manitoba	0	0	0.0%	0	0.0%
British Columbia	0	0	0.0%	0	0.0%
Prince Edward Island	0	0	0.0%	0	0.0%
Total	68	2	3.0%	66	97.0%

== See also ==
- List of Canadian appeals to the Judicial Committee of the Privy Council, 1867–1869
- List of Canadian appeals to the Judicial Committee of the Privy Council, 1880–1889
- List of Canadian appeals to the Judicial Committee of the Privy Council, 1890–1899
- List of Canadian appeals to the Judicial Committee of the Privy Council, 1900–1909
- List of Canadian appeals to the Judicial Committee of the Privy Council, 1910–1919
- List of Canadian appeals to the Judicial Committee of the Privy Council, 1920–1929
- List of Canadian appeals to the Judicial Committee of the Privy Council, 1930–1939
- List of Canadian appeals to the Judicial Committee of the Privy Council, 1940–1949
- List of Canadian appeals to the Judicial Committee of the Privy Council, 1950–1959

== Sources ==
- British and Irish Legal Information Institute: Privy Council Decisions
- 1870 Privy Council Decisions
- 1871 Privy Council Decisions
- 1872 Privy Council Decisions
- 1873 Privy Council Decisions
- 1874 Privy Council Decisions
- 1875 Privy Council Decisions
- 1876 Privy Council Decisions
- 1877 Privy Council Decisions
- 1878 Privy Council Decisions
- 1879 Privy Council Decisions
