= Governor Colville =

Governor Colville may refer to:

- John Colville, 1st Baron Clydesmuir (1894–1954), Governor of Bombay from 1943 to 1948
- Charles Colville (1770–1843), 3rd Governor of Mauritius from 1828 until 1834

== See also ==
- Andrew Colvile (1779–1856), Governor of the Hudson's Bay Company from 1852 to 1856
- Eden Colvile (1819–1893), Governor of the Hudson's Bay Company from 1880 to 1889
