= Charles Kegan Paul =

British author, publisher, and minister (1828–1902)

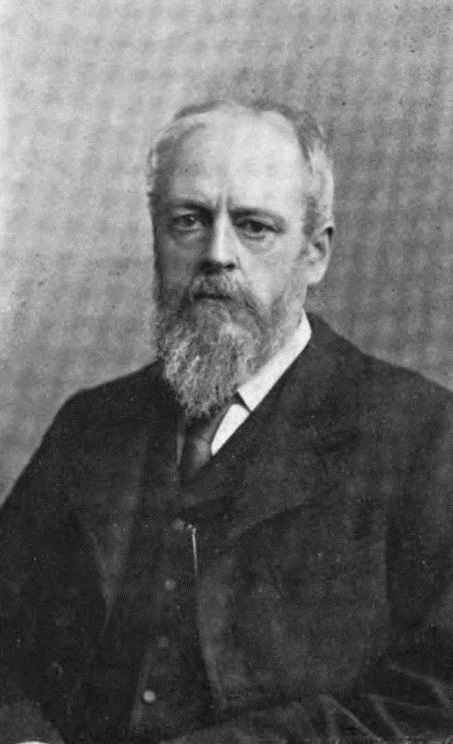
- Paul in later life
- Born: 8 March 1828; Whitelackington, Somerset, England
- Died: 19 July 1902 (aged 74); West Kensington, London, England
- Occupations: Publisher, having initially been a cleric
- Years active: 1851 – 1899
- Notable work: The translation of Faust to English in rhyme in the metres of the original

Charles Kegan Paul (8 March 1828 – 19 July 1902), usually known as Kegan Paul, was an English author, publisher and former Anglican cleric. He began his adult life as a priest of the Church of England and held various ministry positions for more than 20 years. His religious orientation moved from the orthodoxy of the Church of England to first Agnosticism, then Positivism and finally Roman Catholicism.

== Early life ==
Paul was born on 8 March 1828 at Whitelackington, Somerset, the eldest of 10 children of the Reverend Charles Paul (1802 – 1861) and Frances Kegan Horne (1802 – 1848) of Bath, Somerset. He was educated first at Ilminster Grammar School (1836–39), at later at Eton College where he entered Dr Hawtrey's house in 1841 at 13 years of age. Paul matriculated on 29 January 1846 at age 17 and entered Exeter College, Oxford. He received his B.A. degree three years later, in 1849. He was a teetotaller and vegetarian.

== Ordained ministry ==
Paul was ordained deacon in Lent 1851 and was a curate at Great Tew in the Oxford diocese for 1851 – 1852. He was ordained a priest in 1852 and was curate of Bloxham near Banbury, Oxfordshire, for six months. After some time as a tutor to pupils travelling in Germany, Paul was appointed to a chaplain's post at Eton. He was a chaplain and an assistant master for 1853 – 1862. He was also the Master in College, the housemaster of college, the oldest boarding house at Eton, which holds seventy King's Scholars.

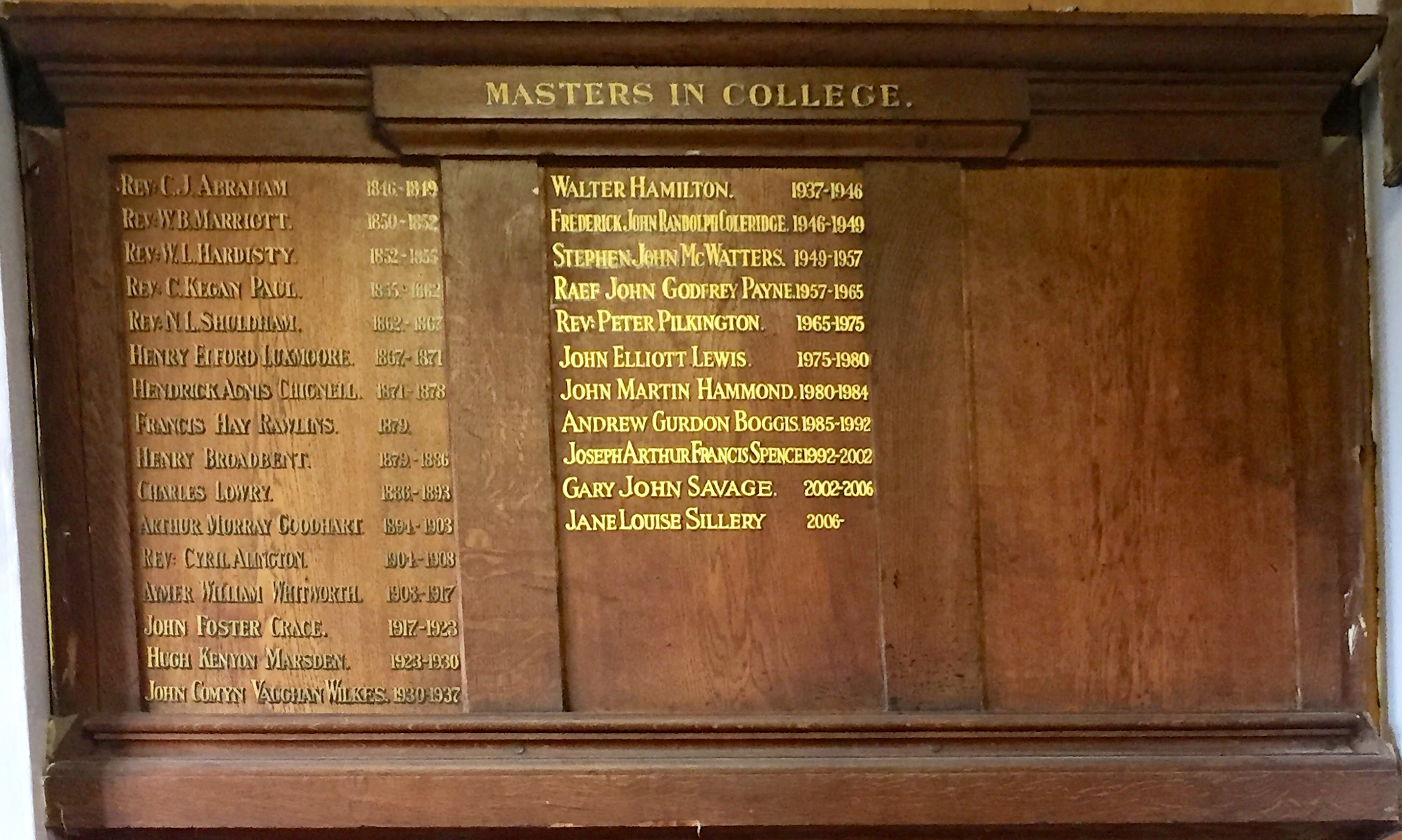
Board in Eton showing the name of the Masters in College

He had not been a King's Scholar himself because although a nomination could be obtained without difficulty, college was at it lowest ebb, in comfort, morals and number. Paul's aunt made a visit to Eton to check out the school before he was sent and reported that the "worst ward in the worst hospital" was preferable to Long Chamber, the dormitory for College. Given the condition of hospitals at the time this was a terrible indictment, and Paul was initially placed instead in Goodford's house. (Note: Paul notes in his autobiography. Memories (p. 62) that the decision not to place him in College was in some ways unfortunate, as the house was reformed in the year that he started at Eton.)

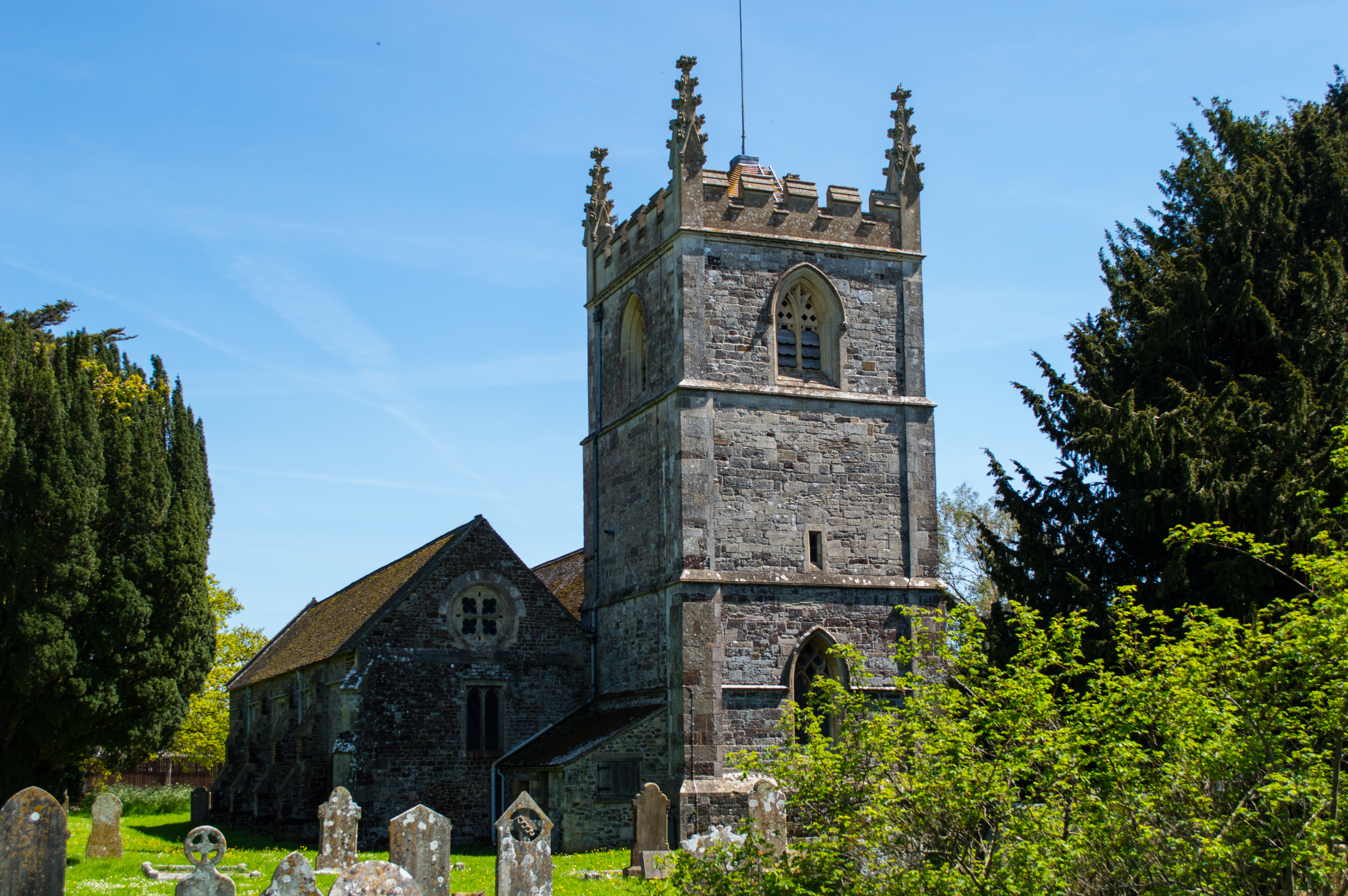
St Mary's Church, Sturminster Marshall, where Paul was vicar for 12 years

He left teaching ar Eton in 1862 and was appointed vicar to Sturminster Marshall, Dorset, a living in the gift of Eton. It was not a large living, being worth less than £300 a year. He ministered there for 12 years. He associated with Joseph Arch's movement on behalf of agricultural labourers in Dorset. Finding himself more and more out of sympathy with the teachings of the Church of England, he abandoned his living and went to London. While he was at Sturminster Marshall he completed the requirements for his M.A. degree which was awarded in 1868.

== Publishing ==
In 1877, he purchased the publishing department of the firm Henry S. King & Co. which had previously published some of his work, and for whom he had been acting as a reader. Paul renamed the firm C. Kegan Paul & Co.

Following his writings on William Godwin and Mary Wollstonecraft, he was of material assistance in helping Elizabeth Robins Pennell write the first full-length biography of the latter.

After a fire in 1883 and other problems, the firm was amalgamated with two other publisher, George Redway, who became a partner, and the heirs of Nicholas Trübner. The new firm, now a Limited Company titled Kegan Paul, Trench, Trübner & Co. Ltd, moved into larger premises in 1891. The firm did well until 1895, when the profits fell suddenly. Redway and Paul lost the confidence of the shareholders and were effectively forced out. Paul retired, having been badly injured in an accident some months earlier.

While the board accepted Paul's resignation, he remained on good terms with the firm, and they published two more of his translations, as well as his Memories and his volume of verse. The firm was eventually merged with George Routledge in 1912.

== Works ==
Paul wrote that although he had been a pretty frequent writer in periodicals and of pamphlets and prefaces, these could be ignored in his bibliography as he had collected in books all that are worth preserving.

As an author he thought nine of his works as worthy of preserving:

1. A Translation of Faust (1873). In Memories Paul acknowledges the help provided by one of his pupils, Richard Brandt, in revising the text and preserving him from the foolish blunders made by other translators.
2. Life of William Godwin (1876) Paul reports that the book had a considerable success and that he had often thought of issuing a condensed volume, but that his own views had changed so much that a lot of changes and explanations would be needed in the revision.
3. Letters of Mary Wollstonecraft (1879)
4. Biographical Sketches Biographical Sketches (1883) The sketches are of: Edward Irving, John Keble, Maria Hare the wife of Augustus William Hare, Rowland Williams, Charles Kingsley, George Eliot, and John Henry Newman
5. The Thoughts of Blaise Pascal: Translated from the text of M. Auguste Molinier (1885)
6. Maria Drummond (1891) Mrs. Drummond was a friend of Paul's and he wrote the short memoir at the request of her surviving daughters, who gave him a free hand to do so.
7. Faith and Unfaith (1891), a collection of seven essays. Paul describes this as a collection of scattered essays such as seemed to me worth preserving and by which I should wish to be remembered . . .
8. En Route (1896) translated by Paul from the French novel written by Joris-Karl Huysmans. The book is the middle novel in a trilogy which are a thinly disguised account of Huysmans' own conversion to Roman Catholicism, and therefore of interest to Paul. Ill health prevented Paul from translating the final volume in the trilogy.
9. By the Way Side: Verses and Translations. (1899) This was a small volume (vii, 103 p. 8º), with a collection of verses. Howsham states that the publication of this volume and Memories by Kegan Paul, Trench, Trübner & Co. in 1899, show that Paul was still on good terms with his former firm.

Paul's final book was his autobiography, Memories (1899).

== Family and later life ==
He married Margaret Agnes Colville, daughter of Andrew Colville (1779–1856), businessman and administrator. Her siblings included James William Colvile, a judge in colonial India; Eden Colvile, Governor of Rupert's Land and the Hudson's Bay Company; Isabella Colville, mother of football pioneer Francis Marindin; and Georgiana Mary, Baroness Blatchford. Their son Eden Paul (1865–1944) was a socialist physician, writer and translator.

Paul was badly injured in a traffic accident while crossing Hammersmith Road in 1895, and the injury left him with chronic pain for the rest of his life.

The Times noted in his obituary that he went from being a clergyman of the Church of England to Agnosticism, Positivism, and finally Catholicism. He was living at 9 Avonmore Road, West Kensington, London when he died on 19 July 1902. His estate was valued at £2,897 9s. 10d.

His portrait had been painted by Anna Lea Merritt and was in the possession of his daughter in 1912.
