= L'Union St Jacques de Montreal v Bélisle =

Canadian constitutional law case - 1874

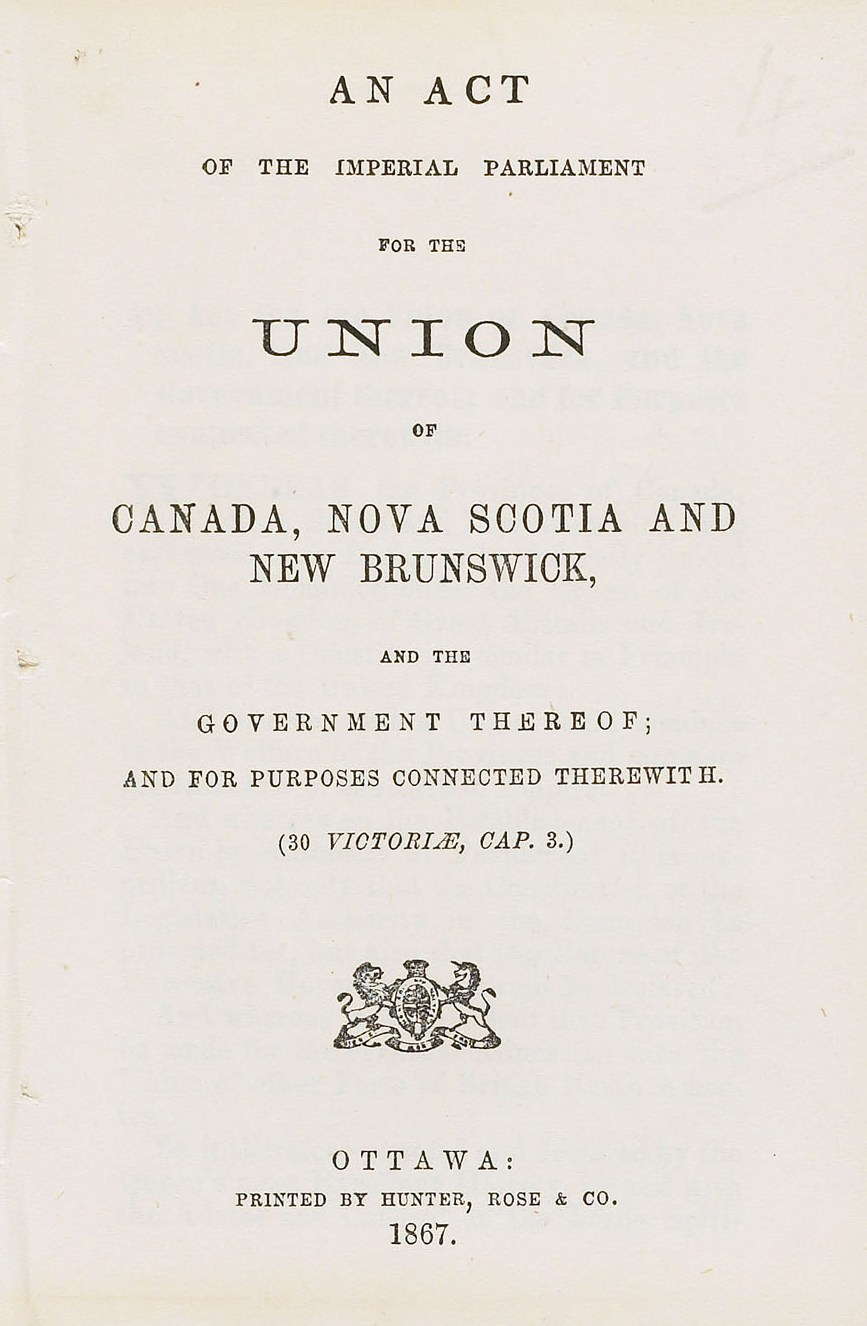
- The British North America Act set out the powers of the federal and provincial governments
- Court: Judicial Committee of the Privy Council
- Full case name: L'Union St-Jacques de Montreal v Dame Julie Bélisle
- Decided: July 8, 1874
- Citations: [1874] UKPC 53, (1874) 6 AC 31 (PC), 20 LC Jur 29

Case history
- Prior actions: Bélisle v L'Union St. Jacques (1870), 15 LC Jur 212 (QC CirCt); upheld, L'Union St-Jacques de Montréal v. Bélisle (1874), 20 LC Jur 29, 5 RLOS 622 (QC QB).
- Appealed from: Quebec Court of Queen's Bench (Appeal Side)

Court membership
- Judges sitting: Lord Selborne; Sir James W. Colvile; Sir Barnes Peacock; Sir Montague E. Smith; Sir Robert P. Collier

Case opinions
- Province has the power to enact legislation to alter the terms of a private contract
- Decision by: Lord Selborne

Keywords
- Bankruptcy and Insolvency; Matters of a Local and Private Nature

L'Union St. Jacques de Montreal v Bélisle is a Canadian constitutional law decision by the Judicial Committee of the Privy Council in 1874. The issue was whether a provincial statute which altered the contractual liabilities of a benevolent organization, reducing its financial obligations to two widows, was within the constitutional authority of the province of Quebec under the British North America Act, 1867 (now known as the Constitution Act, 1867).

It was the first case where the Judicial Committee examined in detail the interplay between the list of federal powers in s. 91 of the Constitution Act, 1867 and the list of provincial powers in s. 92 of the Act. The Judicial Committee held that the legislation was within provincial jurisdiction as a matter of local and private interest, coming under section 92(16) of the Constitution Act, 1867. The statute did not intrude on federal jurisdiction over bankruptcy and insolvency, under s. 91(21) of the Constitution Act, 1867.

The case is included in a collection of significant constitutional decisions from the Judicial Committee, published by the federal Department of Justice.

== Facts ==
L'Union St-Jacques was a benevolent institution in Montreal, founded under provincial law. One of its purposes was to provide annuities to surviving widows of its deceased members, as governed by the contract of membership. However, it found that its annuity commitments exceeded its financial capacities, and if it made the payments as set out in the contract, it would run out of funds.

To deal with this problem, the Legislature of Quebec enacted An Act to relieve L'Union St. Jacques de Montreal. The Act authorised the Union to make block payments of $200 to each of the surviving widows, replacing the annuities, which were to have been paid at the rate of 7s. 6d. per week for life. The Act also provided that if the Union's financial position improved, it then could make up the arrears owing to the widows under the original terms of the contract.

Following the passage of this Act, the Union voted to take advantage of its provisions. Two of the four widows eligible for benefits agreed to accept the block sum of $200 instead of the amounts provided under the contract. The other two widows insisted on receiving the contractual benefits, and challenged the reduction in payments in the courts.

== Decisions of the Quebec courts ==
The two widows brought their action in the Circuit Court of Montreal. As part of their court action, they challenged the constitutionality of the provincial Act which authorised the lower payments, arguing that it was not within provincial authority under s. 92 of the Constitution Act, 1867. They argued that the provincial Act in fact dealt with "Bankruptcy and Insolvency", which are matters of exclusive federal jurisdiction under s. 91(21) of the Constitution Act, 1867. In response, the Union argued that the Act was authorised by s. 92(16) of the Constitution Act, 1867, which gives the provinces power to legislate with respect to "All Matters of a merely local and Private nature in the Province."

On 30 November 1870, Justice Torrance of the Circuit Court accepted the widows' argument and held that the Act was not within the constitutional authority of the Province. The Union then appealed to the Quebec Court of Queen's Bench (Appeal Side). On 20 September 1872, that Court dismissed the appeal, by a 3-2 majority (Duval C.J, Drummond and Monk JJ., Caron and Badgley JJ., dissenting). The majority agreed that the Act dealt with bankruptcy and insolvency and was not within provincial jurisdiction.

== Decision of the Judicial Committee ==
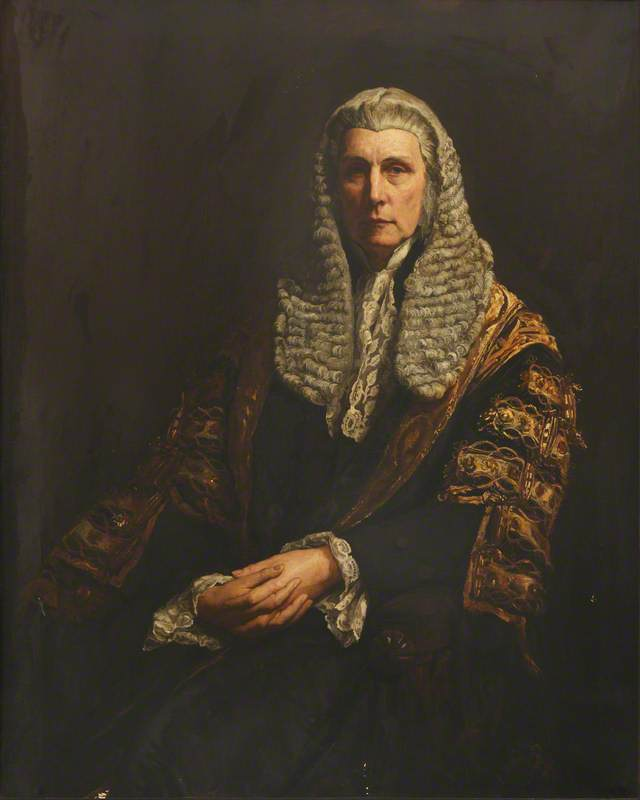
Lord Selborne, who gave the decision upholding the constitutionality of the provincial statute

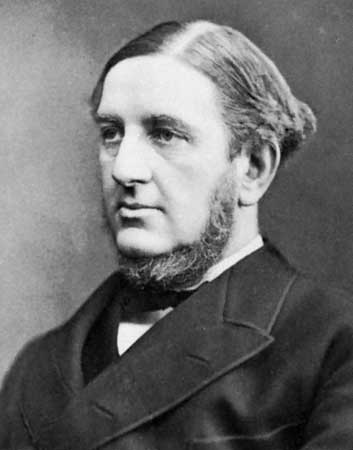
Sir William Harcourt, QC, counsel for the Union

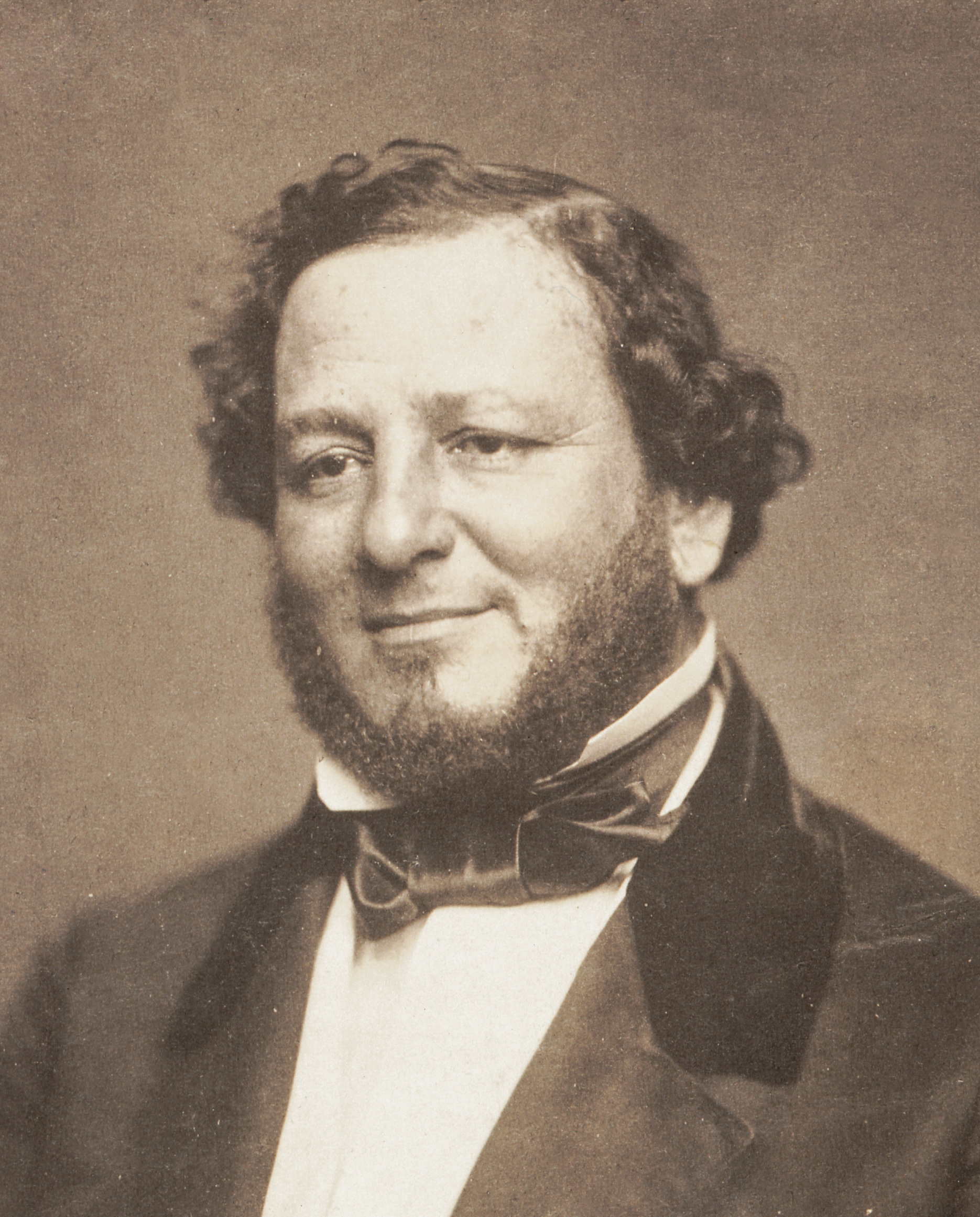
Judah Benjamin, QC, counsel for the widows

The Union then appealed to the Judicial Committee of the Privy Council in Britain, at that time the court of last resort for the colonies of the British Empire, including Canada. (There was no appeal to the Supreme Court of Canada, as that court had not yet been created.) The Union was represented by Sir William Harcourt, QC, and Mr Bompas. The widows were represented by Judah P. Benjamin, QC, and F.W. Gibbs.

Lord Selborne gave the decision for the Committee. He ruled that the statute was constitutional, as a local and private matter, within provincial jurisdiction under s. 92(16) of the Constitution Act, 1867. It dealt solely with the affairs of the Union, which operated in Montreal, and whose members were clearly within provincial jurisdiction. The Act took note of a particular state of affairs of the Union and provided a remedy. The subject matter of the Act was clearly local and private in nature.

Bankruptcy and insolvency, on the other hand, is a general matter, providing a legal system for the administration of estates of persons who may become bankrupt or insolvent. The federal Parliament had not enacted any legislation under this head of power at the time of the events, and to suggest that the mere possibility that Parliament would enact such legislation in future should take the matter out of provincial jurisdiction "... would go very far to destroy that [provincial] power in all cases." Lord Selborne went on to describe the extent to which the federal power could reach:

The words describe in their own legal sense provisions made by law for the administration of the estates of persons who may become bankrupt or insolvent, according to rules and definitions prescribed by law, including of course the conditions in which that law is to be brought into operation, the manner in which it is to be brought into operation, and the effect of its operation.

Lord Selborne noted that there was no proof that the Union was insolvent, and in fact the tendency of the Act was to keep it from becoming insolvent. Nor did the provincial Act terminate the Union, wind it up, or distribute its assets to its creditors. The provincial Act therefore did not deal with bankruptcy and insolvency and did not intrude on federal jurisdiction.

He concluded that the Committee should advise Her Majesty that the appeal be allowed and the original suit be dismissed, with no order as to costs. As was the practice of the Judicial Committee at that time, Selborne gave the decision for the entire committee, with no reasons from any of the other judges.

== Significance of the decision ==
L'Union St. Jacques de Montreal v Bélisle was the first case in which the Judicial Committee gave any detailed analysis of the interplay between s. 91 and s. 92 of the Constitution Act 1867, which are at the heart of the constitutional division of powers between the federal government and the provinces in Canada. (In a previous case, R v Coote, the Judicial Committee had dismissed a constitutional challenge to a provincial statute, but the Committee did not give any detailed reasons on the constitutional point.)

Lord Selborne's definition of the bankruptcy and insolvency power has been described in later jurisprudence as declaring that the Parliament of Canada "has a very wide discretion and is not necessarily limited in the exercise of that discretion by reference to the particular provisions of bankruptcy legislation in England prior to the date of the BNA Act."

Following the abolition of Canadian appeals to the Judicial Committee, the Minister of Justice and Attorney General of Canada directed the Department of Justice to prepare a compilation of all constitutional cases decided by the Judicial Committee on the construction and interpretation of the British North America Act, 1867 (now the Constitution Act, 1867), for the assistance of the Canadian Bench and Bar. This case was included in the three volume collection of constitutional decisions of the Judicial Committee.
