= Margaret Agnes Paul =

Scottish novelist (1829–1905)

- Born: 18 July 1829
- Died: 30 March 1905
- Occupation: Writer
- Spouse: Charles Kegan Paul
- Children: Eden Paul, Nancy Margaret Paul
- Parents: Andrew Colvile (father); Mary Louisa Eden (mother)
- Relatives: James William Colvile, Eden Colvile

Margaret Agnes Paul (18 July 1829 – 30 March 1905) was a Scottish novelist.

Margaret Agnes Colvile was born on 18 July 1829, one of sixteen children of Andrew Colvile, a governor of the Hudson's Bay Company, and Mary Louisa Eden, daughter of William Eden, 1st Baron Auckland. Her siblings included James William Colvile, a judge in colonial India; Eden Colvile, Governor of Rupert's Land and the Hudson's Bay Company; Isabella Colville, mother of football pioneer Francis Marindin; and Georgiana Mary, Baroness Blatchford.

In 1856, she married clergyman and religious author Charles Kegan Paul. They had five children, including authors and translators Eden Paul and Nancy Margaret Paul.

Her writing career began before her marriage. She was the author of a dozen anonymously published romances. When her husband worked for and later purchased the publishing firm Henry S. King & Co., renamed C. Kegan Paul & Co, she published her novels through them.

== Bibliography ==
- Dorothy: A Tale. 1 vol. London: John W. Parker, 1856.
- DeCressy: A Tale. 1 vol. London: John W. Parker, 1856.
- Still Waters. 2 vol. London: John W. Parker, 1857.
- Maiden Sisters: A Tale. 1 vol. London: John W. Parker, 1858.
- Uncle Ralph: A Tale. 1 vol. London: John W. Parker, 1858.
- Martha Brown, the Heiress. 1 vol. London: John W. Parker, 1861.
- Three Weddings. 1 vol. London: Longman, 1870.
- Thomasina: A Biography. 2 vol. London: Henry S. King, 1872.
- Vanessa. 2 vol. London: Henry S. King, 1875.
- Gentle and Simple. 2 vol. London: Kegan Paul, 1878.
- Kintail Place: A Tale of Revolution. 1 vol. London: Swan Sonnenschein, 1886.
