= Attorney General for Quebec v Queen Insurance Company =

Canadian constitutional law case – 1878

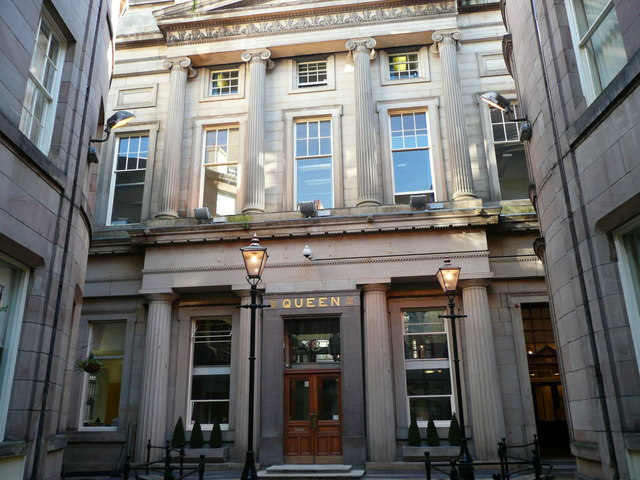
- Queen Insurance Company offices, Liverpool, England
- Court: Judicial Committee of the Privy Council (JCPC)
- Full case name: The Honourable Auguste-Réal Angers, Attorney General for the Province of Quebec, pro Dominà Reginà v. The Queen Insurance Company
- Decided: July 5, 1878
- Citations: (1878), 3 AC 1090 (PC), [1878] UKPC 33, 1 Cart BNA 117, 22 LC Jurist 311

Case history
- Prior actions: Attorney General for Quebec pro Domina Regina v Queen Insurance Company, (1877), 1 Cart BNA 153, 21 LC Jurist 77 (QC SC); upheld on appeal (1877), 1 Cart BNA 131, 16 CLJ 198, 22 LC Jurist 307 (QC QB).
- Appealed from: Quebec Court of Queen's Bench

Court membership
- Judges sitting: Sir James W. Colvile; Sir Barnes Peacock; Sir Montague Smith; Sir Robert P. Collier; Sir George Jessel, Master of the Rolls

Case opinions
- Provincial licensing fee on insurance companies held unconstitutional under the division of powers
- Decision by: Sir George Jessel, Master of the Rolls

Keywords
- Provincial taxation and licensing powers

Attorney General for Quebec v Queen Insurance Company is a Canadian constitutional law decision in 1878, dealing with the taxation and licensing powers of the provinces under the federal-provincial division of powers.

The case concerned a Quebec statute which imposed a licence fee on insurance companies. The issue was whether the fee exceeded provincial authority under the British North America Act, 1867 (now known as the Constitution Act, 1867). The Judicial Committee of the Privy Council (JCPC) in Britain, at that time the court of last resort for Canada within the British Empire, held that the statute was unconstitutional.

This was the first case where the JCPC considered the scope of provincial taxation powers and licensing powers under the Constitution Act, 1867. It was also the first case where the JCPC held that a provincial statute was unconstitutional under the division of powers.

The case is included in a collection of significant constitutional decisions from the Judicial Committee, published by the federal Department of Justice.

== Facts ==
In 1875, the Legislature of Quebec enacted a statute which required every insurance company conducting business in Quebec to take out a licence. The licence fee was calculated as a percentage of the amounts insured by the insurance policies the company issued. The insurance company was to pay the fee by means of provincial revenue stamps purchased from the provincial government, which the insurance company was to attach to each insurance policy it issued. An insurance company which did not attach the necessary stamps to a policy was subject to a fine of $50 for each failure to do so.

The Queen Insurance Company was an insurance company doing business in Montreal. It did not take out the licence required by the provincial legislation, and issued three insurance policies without paying the licensing fee. The Attorney General for Quebec brought an action in the Superior Court of Quebec to recover the $50 penalty for each policy, for a total of $150.

== Decisions of the Quebec courts ==
=== Decision of the Superior Court ===
At trial, the insurance company challenged the constitutional validity of the licence fee. It argued that the legislation exceeded the provincial taxing power set out in section 92(2) of the Constitution Act, 1867 (formerly the British North America Act, 1867), as well as the provincial licensing power set out in s. 92(9).

The insurance company also argued that the provincial law conflicted with a federal act regulating insurance companies. The company had complied with the federal legislation regulating insurance companies, and had paid a federal licensing charge of $150,000 under the federal law. It argued that the licence under the federal statute gave it the right to carry on the business of insurance, without paying a provincial licensing charge.

The insurance company was successful in the Superior Court. Justice Torrance held that the law was an indirect tax and therefore not authorised by s. 92(2) of the Constitution Act, 1867. Relying in part on American federalism precedents, he also held that the licensing provisions intruded on federal jurisdiction.

The Attorney General was represented at trial by Edward Carter, QC, MP and Alexander Lacoste, QC. The Queen Insurance Company was represented by John Abbott, QC (future Prime Minister of Canada), and Joseph Doutre, QC.

=== Decision of the Court of Queen's Bench ===
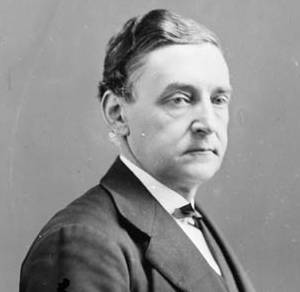
Chief Justice Dorion, one of the judges who held the Act was unconstitutional

The Attorney General appealed to the highest court in Quebec, the Quebec Court of Queen's Bench (Appeal Side). By a 4–1 decision, the Queen's Bench agreed with the decision of the Superior Court and dismissed the appeal.

All of the judges agreed that the stamp fee was an indirect tax, and therefore could not be supported under the provincial taxation power, given by s. 92(2) of the Constitution Act, 1867.

However, they disagreed on whether the stamp duty could be upheld as a licence fee. Four of the judges (Chief Justice Dorion and Justices Taschereau, Monk and Tessier) agreed that the duty was not truly a licence fee, but simply a way to impose an indirect tax that was not within provincial authority under s. 92(9). The licence fee was therefore unconstitutional. In dissent, Justice Ramsay would have held that the fee was a valid licence fee and therefore the statute could have been upheld on that basis.

Justice Taschereau was the only one to address the issue of federal jurisdiction. As part of his analysis of the provincial power to issue licence fees under s. 92(9), he held that insurance companies were subject to federal regulation under the federal jurisdiction over trade and commerce. The province therefore could not impose an additional licence on insurance companies doing business in the province.

== Decision of the Judicial Committee ==
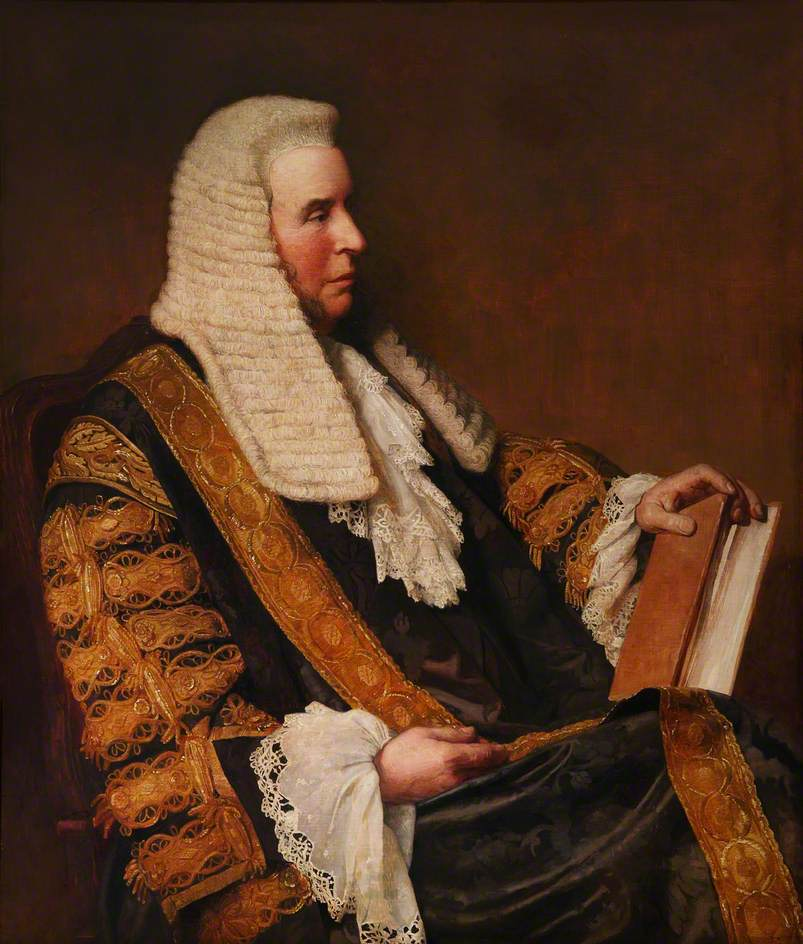
Sir George Jessel, Master of the Rolls, who wrote the decision that the Act was unconstitutional

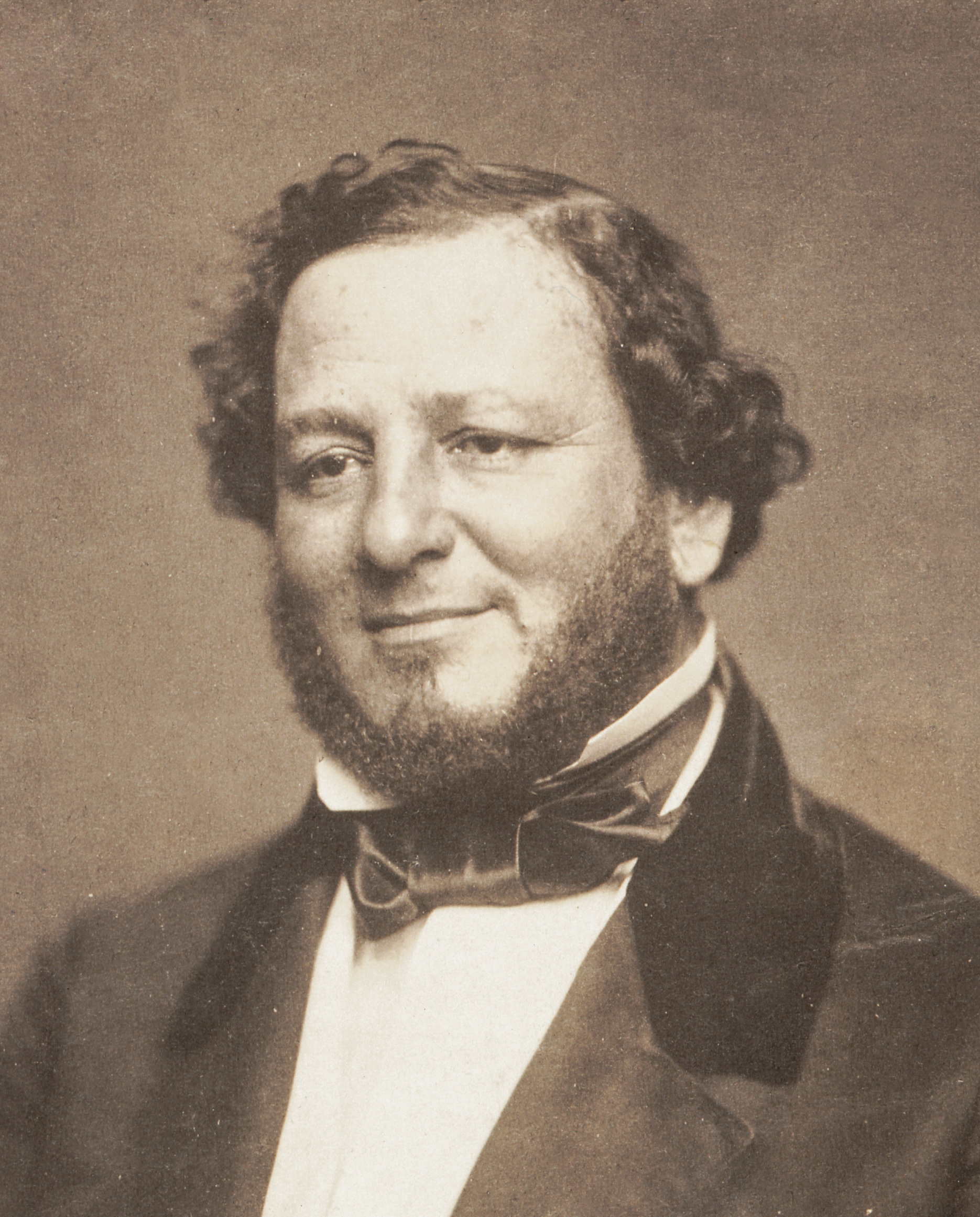
Judah Benjamin, QC, counsel for the Attorney General for Quebec

The Attorney General for Quebec then appealed the case to the Judicial Committee of the Privy Council (JCPC) in Britain, the court of last resort for Canada within the British Empire. (Note: At that time, appeals could go to the Judicial Committee directly from the provincial courts, bypassing the Supreme Court of Canada.) Judah P. Benjamin, QC and John Rigby were counsel for the Attorney General, while the insurance company was represented by Edward Kay, QC and R. W. Gibbs.

The Judicial Committee dismissed the appeal from the bench, without calling on counsel for the insurance company. Sir George Jessell, Master of the Rolls, gave the decision for the committee. He agreed with the Quebec courts that the province did not have the power to impose the fee. Reviewing the Act, he concluded that it was not really a licensing act at all, as there was no penalty for not taking out a licence, and no prohibition on carrying on business without a licence. The policies issued by an unlicensed insurance company were valid, provided they had a stamp on them. He concluded that the only purpose of the Act was to raise a revenue. The province therefore could not rely on s. 92(9) of the Constitution Act, 1867 in support of the Act.

The sole question was whether the fee under the Act was direct or indirect taxation, as s. 92(2) provides that the provinces can only impose direct taxes. Jessel concluded that there was ample authority to conclude that a stamp fee of this type was a form of indirect taxation. It was therefore beyond the provincial power to enact, and the Act was unconstitutional.

Since the case could be decided on the basis that the Act exceeded provincial jurisdiction, the Committee did not need to consider the interplay between provincial powers under s. 92 and federal powers under s. 91 of the Constitution Act, 1867.

As was the practice of the Judicial Committee at that time, Jessel gave the decision for the entire committee, with no reasons from any of the other judges.

== Significance of the decision ==
This was the first case where the Judicial Committee considered the scope of provincial taxation powers under s. 92(2), and provincial licensing powers under s. 92(9). It was also the first case where the Judicial Committee held that a provincial statute was unconstitutional under the division of powers.

The decision has been regularly cited approvingly by the courts since it was made. The most recent reference to it in the Supreme Court of Canada was in Ontario Home Builders' Assn. v. York Region Board of Education. Academic commentators have also referred to the decision.

Following the abolition of Canadian appeals to the Judicial Committee, the Minister of Justice and Attorney General of Canada directed the Department of Justice to prepare a compilation of all constitutional cases decided by the Judicial Committee on the construction and interpretation of the British North America Act, 1867 (now the Constitution Act, 1867), for the assistance of the Canadian Bench and Bar. This case was included in the three volume collection of constitutional decisions of the Judicial Committee.
