= Bourgoin v La Compagnie du Chemin de Fer de Montréal, Ottawa & Occidental, and Ross =

Canadian constitutional law case – 1880

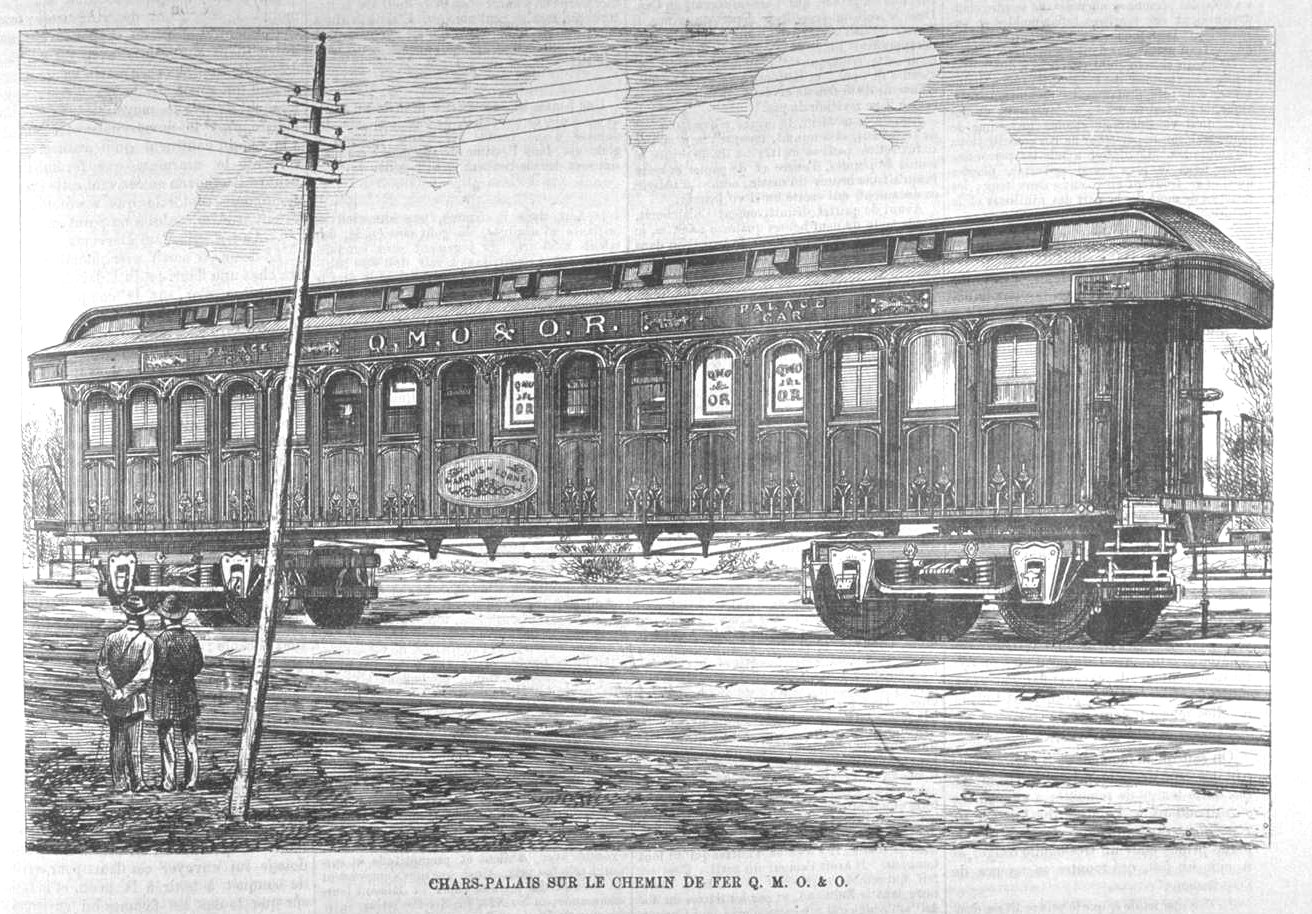
- Quebec, Montreal, Ottawa and Occidental Railway palace car
- Court: Judicial Committee of the Privy Council
- Decided: February 14, 1880, and February 26, 1880
- Citations: [1880] UKPC 8, 5 App Cas 381

Case history
- Appealed from: Quebec Court of Queen's Bench (Appeal Side)

Court membership
- Judges sitting: (1) Ruling on Arbitration Award: Sir James W. Colvile; Sir Barnes Peacock; Sir Montague E. Smith; Sir Robert P. Collier (2) Ruling on Constitutional Issue: Sir James W. Colvile; Sir Barnes Peacock; Sir Montague E. Smith

Case opinions
- Decision by: Sir James W. Colvile

Keywords
- Arbitration awards; division of powers; federally and provincially regulated railways

Bourgoin v La Compagnie du Chemin de Fer de Montréal, Ottawa & Occidental, and Ross is a Canadian constitutional law case decided by the Judicial Committee of the Privy Council, at that time the highest court of appeal for the British Empire. Although the case initially dealt with the power of arbitrators under the federal Railway Act, the underlying constitutional issue was the relationship between federal and provincial regulation of a railway in Quebec. The Judicial Committee ruled that the province could not unilaterally take over ownership and regulation of a federally regulated railway.

The case was on appeal from the courts of Quebec, and was a consolidation of four different legal cases arising out of a single commercial dispute, an expropriation of a quarry by the railway company. At issue was the amount of compensation which the railway company owed to the operators of the quarry, and whether the quarry operators could enforce the monetary award against the property of the railway company. The final result was mixed, with part of the ruling in favour of the railway company and part in favour of the quarry operators.

The case continues to be cited in relation to the interplay between federal and provincial railway regulation. It is included in a collection of significant constitutional decisions from the Judicial Committee, published by the federal Department of Justice.

== Factual background ==
The plaintiffs had a long-term lease of a quarry, allowing them to use and operate it. The defendant was a railway company running along the north shore of the St. Lawrence river, linking Quebec City, Montreal and Ottawa. In 1875, the railway company began proceedings to expropriate the quarry under the federal Railway Act. The parties could not agree on the terms of compensation and the matter went to arbitration under the Railway Act. The arbitrators ruled that the railway company had to pay $35,013 to the quarry operators, with an additional $100 per month until the railway company had made certain defined drainage improvements to the land to protect the neighbouring land of the quarry operators. That award was at the heart of the court actions.

A key issue in the court actions was the application of federal and provincial railway laws. The railway company had originally been incorporated and operated under provincial law, but when it expanded into an inter-provincial railway linking the provinces of Quebec and Ontario, it had been transferred to federal jurisdiction. However, the railway company later ran into financial difficulties, and in 1875, by notarial deed, the railway company ceded the physical railway line, the fixtures and the rolling stock to the province. In 1876, the provincial legislature passed legislation to take over the railway company as a provincial project, merge it with another railway in Quebec, and make it subject to Quebec railway law.

== Decisions of Quebec courts ==
There were four separate decisions of the Quebec courts, but they raised two general issues. The first question was whether the arbitration award was valid. The railway company challenged it on the basis that the arbitrators appointed under the federal Railway Act did not have the authority to impose the condition that the railway company make improvements to the quarry and pay monthly awards until it had done so. In July, 1876, the Superior Court dismissed that action, but in December, 1878, the Quebec Court of Queen's Bench (Appeal Side) allowed the appeal and set aside the award.

The second issue related to the enforcement of the award. After the Superior Court dismissed the railway company's application, but before the Queen's Bench had ruled, the quarrymen sought to enforce the arbitrator's monetary award by applying to the sheriff of Montreal to seize the property of the railway company. However, the government of Quebec, represented by David Alexander Ross, the Attorney General for Quebec, opposed that enforcement attempt, on the basis that the railway was now the property of the government of Quebec and immune from ordinary civil seizure rules. In May, 1878, the Superior Court agreed with the Attorney General's position and held the railway property was immune from seizure. The Queen's Bench subsequently affirmed that decision.

== Decision of the Judicial Committee ==
=== Appeal and counsel ===
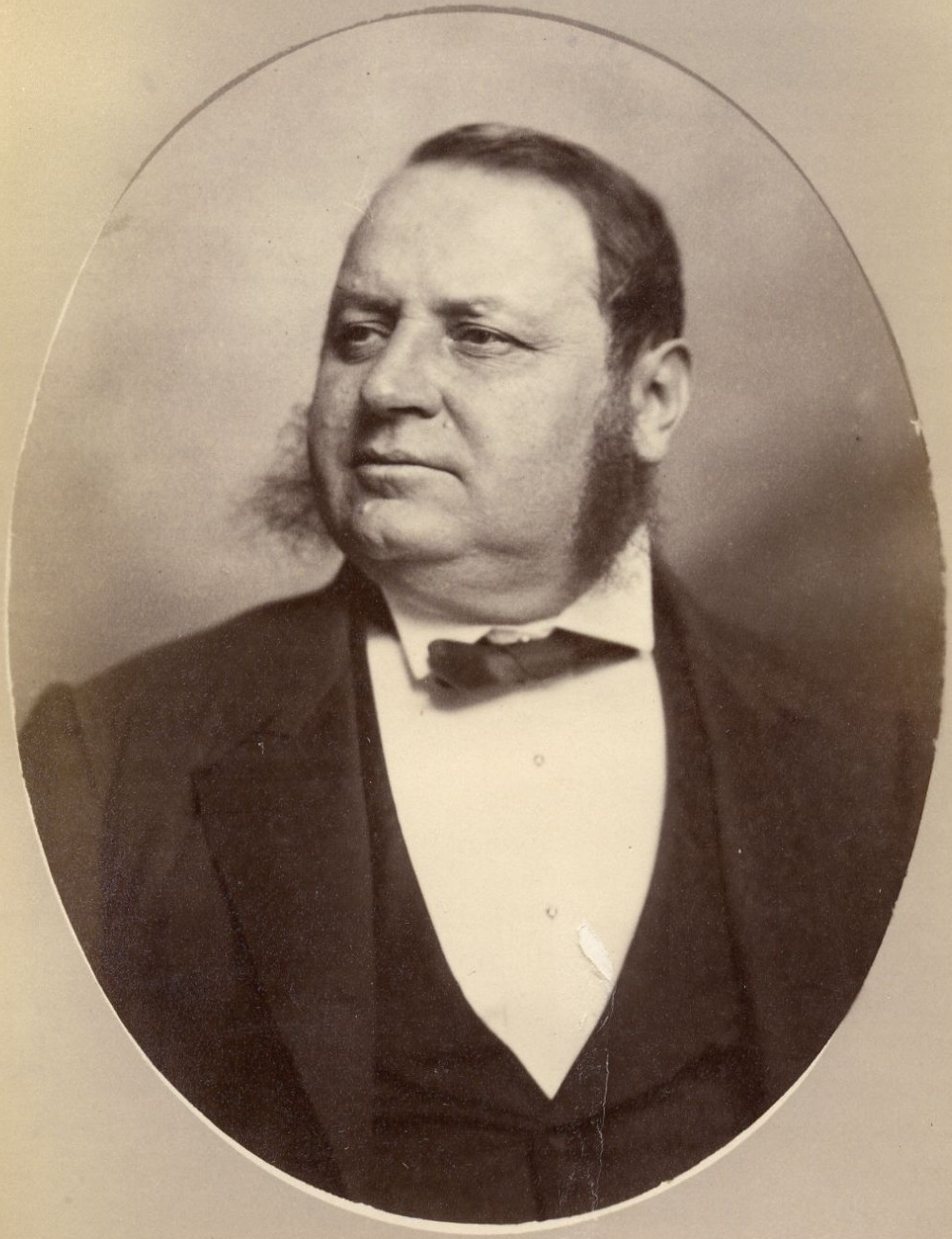
Joseph Doutre, QC, lead counsel for the quarry operators

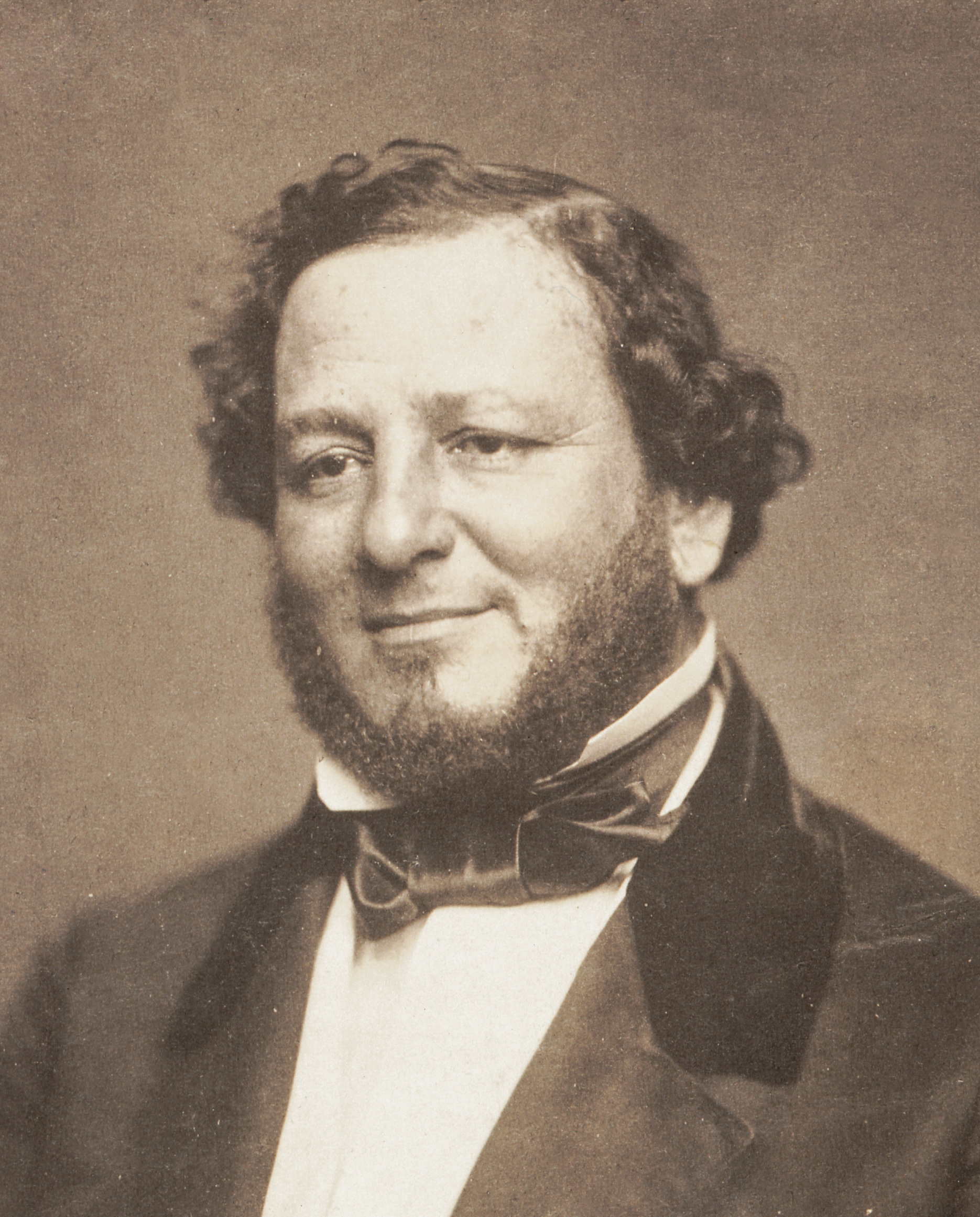
Judah P. Benjamin, QC, lead counsel for the railway company

The quarry operators then appealed all four cases to the Judicial Committee of the Privy Council in Britain. At that time, the Judicial Committee was the highest court of appeal for the British Empire. Appeals could go directly to the Judicial Committee from the provincial appellate courts, bypassing the Supreme Court of Canada. The quarrymen were represented by Joseph Doutre, QC, of the Bar of Quebec, and a British barrister, Mr Fullerton. The railway company were represented by two British barristers, Judah P. Benjamin, QC, and Francis Jeune.

=== Ruling on the arbitration award ===
The Judicial Committee approached the case in two stages, beginning with the arbitration award. The Committee heard the submissions from counsel on February 12 and 13, 1880, and gave an oral decision on February 14, 1880.

Speaking for the Committee, Sir James Colvile upheld the decision of the Court of Queen's Bench and dismissed the appeal of the quarry operators. He held that the statutory provision for arbitration only gave the arbitrators the power to assess the value of the expropriated land. The statute did not give them the power to direct the railway company to perform improvements to the land, nor to award monthly compensation until the improvements were complete.

He also held that the order for land improvements could not be severed from the award, because the order for monthly payments might otherwise have been included in some way in the global award. He therefore held that the entire award had to be set aside.

The members of the Committee then asked counsel if there was any need to deal with the constitutional issue, or if their ruling on the arbitration award resolved the dispute. Doutre, counsel for the quarry operators, advised the Committee that he considered it would be of assistance to have the enforcement issue resolved. The Committee then set the constitutional issue down for argument.

=== Ruling on the constitutional issue ===
The Committee gave its decision on the constitutional issue on February 26, 1880. Unlike the hearing on the arbitration issue, the Committee was only composed of three members, as Sir Robert P. Collier was not present. Sir James Colvile again gave the decision of the Committee, this time ruling in favour of the quarry operators.

He held that the transaction concerning the railway and the government of Quebec did much more than simply transfer the railway property to the province. In addition to the notarial deed transferring the property, the government of Quebec had enacted a statute which merged the railway company with another railway, the North Shore railway, and declared the new railway company to be a provincial railway and subject to the Quebec Railway Act.

Colvile held that these changes were beyond the legislative authority of the province. The railway had previously been transferred to federal jurisdiction, by a federal statute enacted under s. 92(10)(c) of the British North America Act, 1867 (now the Constitution Act, 1867). Once the railway had been transferred from provincial jurisdiction to federal jurisdiction, the province lost the power to pass legislation to reorganise the railway and regulate it under provincial railway legislation. For the transfer of property to the province to be valid, it would have had to be ratified by the federal Parliament, which had never occurred. The property of the railway was therefore subject to ordinary process for the enforcement of debts and civil judgments, such as an arbitration award.

As was the practice of the Judicial Committee at that time, Colville gave the decision for the entire committee, with no reasons from any of the other judges.

== Significance of the decision ==
The case continues to be cited in one of the leading Canadian legal research guides, for the proposition that provincial law cannot transfer the property rights in a federally regulated railway.

Following the abolition of Canadian appeals to the Judicial Committee in 1949, the Minister of Justice and Attorney General of Canada directed the Department of Justice to prepare a compilation of all constitutional cases decided by the Judicial Committee on the construction and interpretation of the British North America Act, 1867, for the assistance of the Canadian Bench and Bar. This case was included in that three volume collection of constitutional decisions of the Judicial Committee.
