= R v Coote =

Canadian constitutional law case – 1873

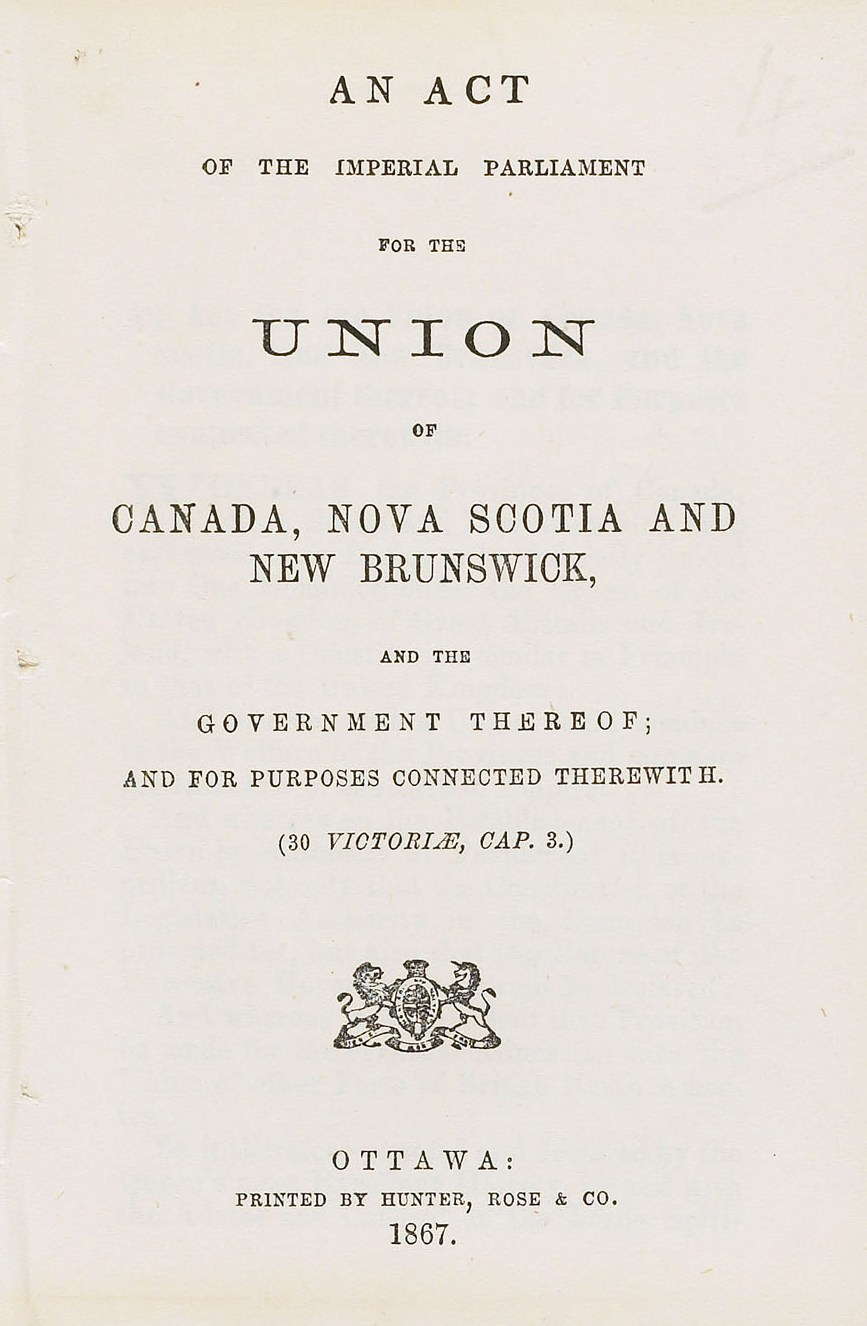
- R v Coote was the first decision of the Judicial Committee interpreting the British North America Act, 1867
- Court: Judicial Committee of the Privy Council
- Full case name: Our Sovereign Lady the Queen v Edward Coote
- Decided: March 18, 1873
- Citations: (1873) LR 4 PC 599; [1873] UKPC 26; (1873) 9 Moo PC NS 426; 17 ER 587

Case history
- Appealed from: Quebec Court of Queen's Bench

Court membership
- Judges sitting: Sir James W. Colvile; Sir Barnes Peacock; Lord Justice Mellish; Sir Montague Smith; Sir Robert P. Collier

Case opinions
- Provincial statute authorising inquiries by fire commissioners within provincial authority. Statements could be used in criminal prosecution.
- Decision by: Sir Robert P. Collier

Keywords
- Provincial inquiry power; Admissibility of depositions

R v Coote is a Canadian constitutional law decision in 1873 dealing with the powers of the provinces under the British North America Act, 1867 (now the Constitution Act, 1867). The point in issue was whether Quebec had the constitutional authority to create a mandatory inquiry power for provincial fire commissioners.

The case was ultimately decided by the Judicial Committee of the Privy Council, at that time the court of last resort for Canada within the British Empire. It was the first decision by the Judicial Committee analysing the division of powers under the Constitution of Canada.

The Judicial Committee held that the mandatory inquiry power was within provincial authority. The Judicial Committee also held that evidence given by an individual in response to a mandatory inquiry could later be used as evidence against that individual in a criminal prosecution for arson.

The case is included in a collection of significant constitutional decisions from the Judicial Committee, published by the federal Department of Justice.

== Facts ==
In 1871, there was a fire in the warehouse owned by the accused, Edward Coote, in Montreal, Quebec. Fire commissioners appointed under provincial law investigated the fire. In the course of their investigation, they twice interrogated Mr. Coote. Under the authority granted by provincial law, Mr. Coote was required to respond to the questions of the fire commissioners.

Subsequently, Mr. Coote was charged with four counts of arson with intent to defraud various insurance companies. He was tried before a single judge of the Quebec Court of Queen's Bench, sitting with a jury. The Crown successfully entered the two depositions in evidence. The jury convicted Mr. Coote. The trial judge reserved questions of law for the full Court to consider, including the validity of the provincial statute and the admissibility of the depositions in evidence against the accused.

== Decision of the Quebec Court of Queen's Bench ==
On 15 March 1872, the Quebec Court of Queen's Bench (Appeal Side) allowed the accused's appeal in a 3-2 decision. The majority held that while the provincial statute in question was within the constitutional authority of the Province, the depositions could not be admitted in the criminal trial. The Court quashed the guilty verdict.

== Decision of the Judicial Committee ==
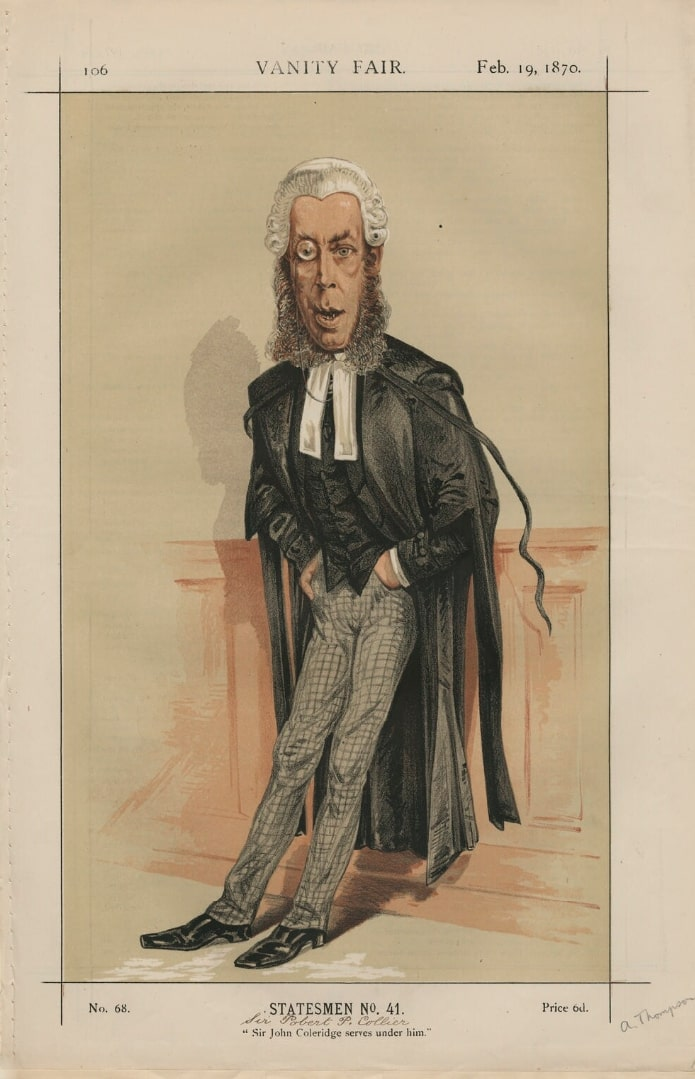
Sir Robert Collier, QC, who gave the decision for the Judicial Committee

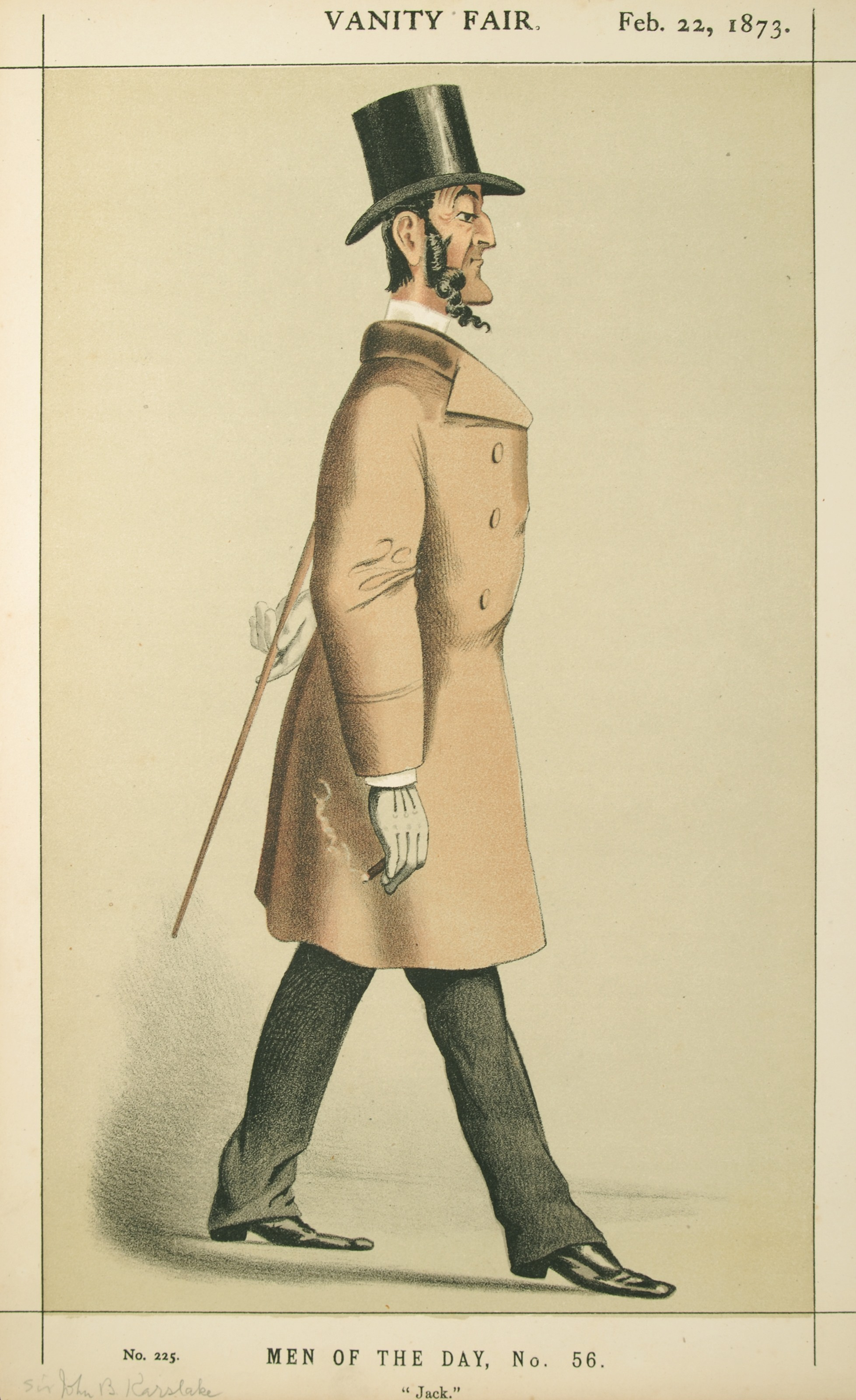
Sir John Kerslake, QC, counsel for the Crown

The Crown then sought to appeal from the Quebec Queen's Bench to the Judicial Committee of the Privy Council, sitting in London, which at this time was the highest court of appeal for the British Empire. (The Supreme Court of Canada had not yet been created.) The Judicial Committee initially refused leave to appeal, but then granted a special application for leave. On the hearing of the appeal, the accused did not appear, in person nor by counsel. The Committee therefore heard the case ex parte on 11 March 1873. The appellant Crown was represented by Sir John Karslake, Q.C., and H.M. Bompas.

The Judicial Committee gave its decision on 18 March 1873, allowing the Crown appeal. Sir Robert P. Collier gave the decision for the Committee. He briefly disposed of the constitutional issue, referring to the lower court's conclusion that the law was within provincial jurisdiction and stating that the Committee agreed with that ruling. As was the practice of the Judicial Committee at that time, Collier gave the decision for the entire committee, with no reasons from any of the other judges.

The main focus of his decision was on the issue of the admissibility of the two depositions in the subsequent criminal trial. He concluded that "the depositions on Oath of a Witness legally taken are evidence against him, should he be subsequently tried on a criminal charge", except for questions which the witness had objected to answering. He also concluded that the fire commissioners did not have any duty to warn Mr Coote of his right to have counsel present, since they had not arrested him at the time of the questioning.

As a result, the Committee advised Her Majesty that the appeal should be allowed, that the conviction at trial be affirmed and that the Quebec Court of Queen's Bench pass sentence on Mr Coote.

== Significance of the decision ==
R. v. Coote was the first case which considered (albeit very briefly) the constitutional division of powers under the Constitution Act, 1867.

The Supreme Court of Canada continues to cite the Coote case with approval, for the proposition that the provinces have the constitutional authority to enact legislation creating public inquiries with the power to compel testimony from witnesses.

This case is included in the three volume set of significant decisions of the Judicial Committee on the construction and interpretation of the British North America Act, 1867 (now the Constitution Act, 1867), prepared on the direction of the then Minister of Justice and Attorney General, Stuart Sinclair Garson, QC. He directed that the Department of Justice prepare the collection "for the convenience of the Bench and Bar in Canada", following the abolition of Canadian appeals to the Judicial Committee. This case was included in the first volume of the set.
