= Eden Colvile =

British administrator (1819–1893)

Governor of Rupert's Land
- In office 1849–1852

Governor of the Hudson's Bay Company
- In office 1880–1889
- Preceded by: George Joachim Goschen
- Succeeded by: Donald Alexander Smith

Personal details
- Born: 12 February 1819 Langley Farm, Beckenham, Kent
- Died: 2 April 1893 (aged 74) Lustleigh, Devon
- Spouse: Anne Maxwell
- Relations: James William Colvile (brother); Margaret Agnes Colvile (sister); Eden Paul (nephew)
- Parent: Andrew Colvile (father)
- Education: Eton College
- Alma mater: Trinity College, Cambridge
- Occupation: Administrator, company director

Eden Colvile (12 February 1819 – 2 April 1893) was a businessman primarily notable as the governor of the Hudson's Bay Company, a huge organisation set up for the North American fur trade and instrumental in the early history of Canada.

== Family background ==
Colvile was born at Langley Farm, part of the Langley Park Estate, near Beckenham, Kent, England, son of Andrew Colvile and Mary Louisa Eden. His father was a merchant and member of board of the Hudson's Bay Company. His mother was fifth daughter of William Eden, 1st Baron Auckland, and thus connected to an influential family of politicians and diplomats.

Eden Colville was one of four brothers and 12 sisters:

1. Eleanor Colvile (1808–1824)
2. James William Colvile (1810–1880) was a lawyer, civil servant and then judge in India, and a judge on the Judicial Committee of the Privy Council, the court of last resort for the British colonies.
3. John Colvile (1811–1830)
4. Isabella Colvile (1812–1896) married a clergyman in rural England and was the mother of Francis Marindin, a key figure in early football.
5. George Colvile (1813–1814)
6. Louisa Colvile (1815–1836)
7. Emily Colvile (1817–1889)
8. Eden Colvile (1819–1893) was appointed Governor of Rupert's Land and later governor of the HBC.
9. Jean Colville (1820–1895)
10. Georgiana Mary Colvile (1822–1889) married Frederic Rogers, 1st Baron Blachford, a mandarin of Whitehall.
11. Charlotte Colvile (1823–)
12. Isalen Mary Colvile (1825–)
13. Caroline Colvile (1827–1846)
14. Margaret Agnes Colvile (1829–) in 1858 married the writer and publisher Charles Kegan Paul.
15. Alice Douglas Colvile (1830–1845)
16. Katharine Colvile (July 1834 – November 1834)

The son of his sister Margaret was named after him; Eden Paul became a socialist physician and translator.

== Education and early career ==
Colvile was educated at Eton and Trinity College, Cambridge. After graduating from Cambridge in 1841, he travelled to Lower Canada (Quebec) to manage the seigneury of Beauharnois for the North American Colonial Association of Ireland, of which his father was deputy governor. He served one year in the Legislative Assembly in 1844.

== Canada ==
His relationship with the Hudson's Bay Company, North America's oldest company (established by English royal charter in 1670), began in 1848 when he accompanied George Simpson to Rupert's Land, travelling as far as the Red River Colony. After his return to England, he was soon appointed Governor of Rupert's Land, relieving Simpson of his obligations inland. After seeing the troubles which rocked the Red River Colony in the late 1840s with the Guilleume Sayer trial, the Foss-Pelly slander trial and the difficulties between the Presbyterian Scots and the Anglicans, the Company needed someone like Colvile who would wield a firm hand in the Settlement. However, he spent his first winter on the Pacific coast, sorting out the affairs of the troubled Pugets Sound Agricultural Company.

In August 1850, he arrived in the Red River Colony with his wife, Anne Maxwell. They took up residence in the "Big House" at Lower Fort Garry. He quickly took charge of the affairs of the colony. He took over as president of the Council of Assiniboia, removed Adam Thom from his position of power, and arranged a compromise between the Presbyterians and Anglicans. Solving the difficulties which arose from the Foss-Pelly slander trial took more delicate maneuvering, but he succeeded by removing the major players in the trial from the Settlement. After accomplishing the tasks he was sent to fix, he and his wife returned to England in 1852.

== Later life ==
He took on many of his father's directorships which included the chairmanship of the board of the Royal Mail Steam Packet Company. He joined the London committee of the HBC in 1854. After a reorganization of the HBC in the mid-1860s where he was only one of two to remain, he became deputy governor in 1871, governor in 1880 and retired in 1889. He died in Lustleigh, Devon, on Easter Sunday 1893.
