= James William Colvile =

British judge and administrator in India

The Right Honourable Sir James William Colvile FRS
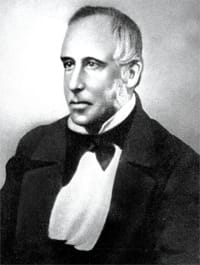

Judicial Committee of the Privy Council
- In office November 1865 – 6 December 1880

Personal details
- Born: 12 January 1810
- Died: 6 December 1880 (aged 70) London
- Spouse: Frances Elinor Grant (m. 1857)
- Parent: Andrew Wedderburn Colvile (father)
- Relatives: Eden Colvile (brother); Margaret Colvile (sister)
- Education: Eton College
- Alma mater: Trinity College, Cambridge

Sir James William Colvile (12 January 1810 – 6 December 1880) was a British lawyer, civil servant and then judge in India, and a judge on the Judicial Committee of the Privy Council, the court of last resort for the British colonies.

== Life ==
He was born the eldest son of Andrew Wedderburn Colvile of Ochiltree and Crombie, Fife and educated at Eton College and Trinity College, Cambridge, where he graduated MA in 1834. He trained as a barrister and was called to the bar in 1835.

He practised at Lincoln's Inn for ten years before being appointed Advocate General to the East India Company in 1845. He went to Calcutta and was appointed Puisne Judge to the Supreme Court of Bengal in 1848 and Chief Justice of Bengal in 1855. He was knighted in 1848.

He was the first vice-chancellor of the University of Calcutta. He served in this office for two years, from 24 January 1857 to 24 January 1859. He was president of The Asiatic Society.

He retired and returned to England in 1859. He was made a Privy Counsellor, initially as an Assessor to the Judicial Committee of the Council of India appeals, and eventually as a full member of the Judicial Committee of the Privy Council. He gave the decision of the Judicial Committee in two constitutional cases from Canada dealing with federal jurisdiction over railways: Dow v. Black (1875), and Bourgoin v La Compagnie du Chemin de Fer de Montréal, Ottawa & Occidental, and Ross (1880).

In April 1875, he was elected a fellow of the Royal Society.

He died in London, of heart failure on 6 December 1880.

== Family ==
He married in 1857 Frances Elinor, daughter of Sir John Peter Grant, K.C.B., G.C.M.G., of Rothiemurchus, lieutenant-governor of Lower Bengal. They had one son, Andrew John Wedderburn, born in 1859, who died in 1876.

Legal offices
Preceded by Sir Lawrence Peel	Supreme Court of Judicature at Fort William; 1855–1859	Succeeded by Sir Barnes Peacock
