= List of Canadian appeals to the Judicial Committee of the Privy Council, 1880–1889 =

List of Canadian appeals to the JCPC (1880–1889)

This page lists all appeals to the Judicial Committee of the Privy Council from the Canadian courts, decided in the years 1880 to 1889.

From 1867 to 1949, the JCPC was the highest court of appeal for Canada (and, separately, for Newfoundland). During this period, its decisions on Canadian appeals were binding precedent on all Canadian courts, including the Supreme Court of Canada. Any decisions from this era that the Supreme Court of Canada has not overruled since gaining appellate supremacy in 1949 remain good law, and continue to bind all Canadian courts other than the Supreme Court.

The Parliament of Canada abolished appeals to the JCPC of criminal cases in 1933 and civil cases in 1949. Ongoing cases that had begun before those dates remained appealable to the JCPC. The final JCPC ruling on a Canadian case was rendered in 1959, in Ponoka-Calmar Oils v Wakefield.

== 1880–1889 ==
| Case name | Citation | Subject (Exact Text from First Paragraph of Judgment) | Judges (Author of Decision in Bold) | Appeal Allowed or Dismissed | On Appeal from |
|---|---|---|---|---|---|
| Goldring v. La Banque D’Hochelaga | [1880] UKPC 5 | "Their Lordships, upon the best consideration they can give to this case, are of opinion that it is not one in which it was competent to the Court of Queen's Bench to grant the leave to appeal. The 1,178th Article of the Code of Procedure is precise that an appeal lies to Her Majesty in her Privy Council from final judgments rendered in appeal or error by the Court of Queen's Bench. Then it gives the cases in which the appeal is allowed. There is no express provision for the allowance of such an Appeal from an interlocutory Order." | Sir James W. Colvile; Sir Barnes Peacock; Sir Montague E. Smith; Sir Robert P. Collier | Appeal allowed | Quebec Court of Queen's Bench (Appeal Side) |
| Dorion v. Les Ecclésiastiques du Séminaire de St. Sulpice de Montréal | [1880] UKPC 6 | "This appeal arises in two actions which were brought in the Superior Court of the Province of Quebec. The original action was brought by La Corporation de la Paroisse du Sault au Recollet against Les Ecclésiastiques du Séminaire de St. Sulpice de Montréal, to recover the expenses of the repair of part of a road which the seminary was liable by the general law to repair. The seminary, who are the Respondents in the present Appeal, then brought an action en garantie against the Appellant, Mr. Dorion, to compel him to indemnify them from the consequences of the action by the parish, on the ground that he held an estate subject to an obligation to repair the portion of the road in respect of which the seminary were sued by the parish." | Sir James W. Colvile; Sir Barnes Peacock; Sir Montague E. Smith; Sir Robert P Collier | Appeal dismissed | Quebec Court of Queen's Bench (Appeal Side) |
| Bourgoin and another v. La Compagnie du Chemin de Fer de Montréal, Ottawa and Occidental and Ross | [1880] UKPC 8;[1880] UKPC 9 | "The only question which has been fully argued upon the four appeals consolidated in this record is whether the judgment of the Court of Queen's Bench rendered in the first suit, No. 693, was right in annulling and setting aside the award of the 28th of July 1876 upon either of the grounds stated in it. As to one of those grounds which proceeds upon the assumption that the lump sum of $35,013, awarded to the Appellants, included the whole value of the land, and not merely the value of their interest as lessees, it is not necessary to say anything, because that objection has not been pressed." | **Sir James W. Colvile**; Sir Barnes Peacock; Sir Montague E. Smith; Sir Robert P. Collier | Appeal allowed in part | Quebec Court of Queen's Bench (Appeal Side) |
| Symes and another v. Cuvillier and another | [1880] UKPC 12 | "The action which gives occasion to this appeal was brought in the Superior Court of Lower Canada by the Respondents, Marie Angelique Cuvillier, and her husband, Mr. Delisle, against the Appellants, Marie Anne Claire Symes, and her husband, Le Marquis de Bassano, to recover two instalments of an annual income of 150l., representing a capital sum of 2,500l., in virtue of a donation contained in a notarial deed executed by La Marquise before her marriage. The defence was, that by the law of Lower Canada existing at the date of the deed (29th May 1866), the gift was revoked by the subsequent birth of children of the donor." | Sir James W. Colvile; Sir Montague E. Smith; Sir Robert P. Collier | Appeal dismissed | Quebec Court of Queen's Bench (Appeal Side) |
| Cushing v. Dupuy | [1880] UKPC 22 | "This appeal is from a judgment of the Court of Queen's Bench of the Province of Quebec, reversing the judgment of a Judge of the Superior Court, which had been given in the Appellant's favour, in certain proceedings in insolvency instituted under an Act of Parliament of the Dominion of Canada, intituled "An Act respecting Insolvency" (38 Vict., c. 16)." | Sir James W. Colvile; Sir Barnes Peacock; **Sir Montague E. Smith**; Sir Robert P. Collier | Appeal dismissed | Quebec Court of Queen's Bench (Appeal Side) |
| Lawless v. Sullivan | [1881] UKPC 14 | "The question to be determined on this appeal is whether the Appellant, as the manager of the Bank of British North America, in the city of St. Johns [sic], in the Province of New Brunswick, was in 1876 rightly assessed by the Respondents, the then assessors of taxes for that city, in the sum of $1,725 for the fiscal year, beginning on the 1st of January and ending on the 31st day of December 1875. The question is one of general importance, since it involves the principle upon which any incorporated Joint Stock Bank or other Company established out of the limits of the Province of New Brunswick, and any person doing business out of such limit, but having a branch or agency in the city of St. John's, is liable to be assessed under the Acts relating to the levying of rates in the said city." | Sir Barnes Peacock; Sir Montague E. Smith; Sir Robert P. Collier; Sir Richard Couch | Appeal allowed | Supreme Court of Canada |
| The Connecticut Mutual Life Insurance Company of Hartford, Connecticut v. Kate Douglas Moore | [1881] UKPC 34 | "This is a suit by one of the children of Mr. Charles Moore deceased against the Connecticut Mutual Life Insurance Company, upon a policy of insurance on the life of Charles Moore, the Plaintiff claiming the share to which she is entitled under that policy. The declaration set out the policy, together with the questions and the answers that were made to them, and concluded with a general statement that all things had happened which were necessary to entitle the Plaintiff to recover. The Defendants pleaded several pleas, of which the most material are the 2nd and the 4th." | Sir Barnes Peacock; Sir Montague E. Smith; Sir Robert P. Collier; Sir Richard Couch; Sir Arthur Hobhouse | Appeal dismissed | Supreme Court of Canada |
| The Citizens Insurance Company of Canada and The Queen Insurance Company v Parsons | [1881] UKPC 49 | "The questions in these appeals arise in two actions brought by the same Plaintiff (the Respondent) upon contracts of insurance against fire of buildings situate in the Province of Ontario, in the Dominion of Canada. The most important question in both appeals is one of those, already numerous, which have arisen upon the provisions of The British North America Act, 1867, relating to the distribution of legislative powers between the Parliament of Canada and the Legislatures of the Provinces, and, owing to the very general language in which some of these powers are described, the question is one of considerable difficulty." | Sir Barnes Peacock; **Sir Montague E. Smith**; Sir Robert P. Collier; Sir Richard Couch; Sir Arthur Hobhouse | Appeal dismissed | Supreme Court of Canada |
| Rev. Robert Dobie v. The Board for Management of the Presbyterian Church of Canada in connection with the Church of Scotland et al. | [1882] UKPC 4 | "The first question raised in this appeal is, whether the Legislature of the Province of Quebec had power, in the year 1875, to modify or repeal the enactments of a statute passed by the Parliament of the Province of Canada in the year 1858 (22 Vict., cap. 66), intituled 'An act to incorporate the Board for the management of the Temporalities Fund of the Presbyterian Church of Canada in connection the Church of Scotland'." | Lord Blackburn; **Lord Watson**; Sir Barnes Peacock; Sir Montague E. Smith; Sir Robert P. Collier; Sir Richard Couch; Sir Arthur Hobhouse | Appeal allowed | Quebec Court of Queen's Bench (Appeal Side) |
| The Western Counties Railway Company v. The Windsor and Annapolis Railway Company | [1882] UKPC 14 | "In the present case, each of the contending parties claims the exclusive right to possess and work the Windsor Branch Railway, in the province of Nova Scotia. This line was originally constructed as one of the public railways of the province, and was intended to be part of a general system connecting Halifax and other towns of importance with the frontier of the province of New Brunswick. After the passing of the British North America Act, 1867, and in accordance with its provisions, all railways belonging to the province of Nova Scotia, including the line in question, passed to and became vested in the Dominion of Canada." | Lord Blackburn; Lord Watson; Sir Barnes Peacock; Sir Robert P. Collier; Sir Arthur Hobhouse | Appeal dismissed | Supreme Court of Nova Scotia |
| The Queen v. Belleau and others | [1882] UKPC 31 | "This is a petition of right against the Crown, by the holders of certain debentures issued by 'the Trustees of the Quebec turnpike roads,' for payment of the principal and interest of their debentures." | Sir Barnes Peacock; Sir Montague E. Smith; Sir Robert P. Collier; **Sir James Hannen**; Sir Richard Couch | Appeal allowed | Supreme Court of Canada |
| Russell v. The Queen | [1882] UKPC 33 | "This is an appeal from an order of the Supreme Court of the Province of New Brunswick, discharging a rule Nisi which had been granted on the application of the Appellant for a certiorari to remove a conviction made by the Police Magistrate of the city of Frederickton against him, for unlawfully selling intoxicating liquors, contrary to the provisions of 'the Canada Temperance Act, 1878'." | Sir Barnes Peacock; **Sir Montague E. Smith**; Sir Robert P. Collier; Sir James Hannen; Sir Richard Couch | Appeal dismissed | Supreme Court of New Brunswick |
| Prince v. Gagnon | [1882] UKPC 51 | "This petition before us is for liberty to appeal against a judgment of the Supreme Court of the Dominion of Canada. The suit involved a question as to a sum of about 1,000l. On one side it was alleged that this sum ought to be taken into account, as it represented goods which were given upon a contract of sale by the father to the son on the occasion of the father relinquishing business in favour of the son at the time of the son's marriage. On the other hand, it was alleged that the transaction in question was not a sale, and that it was a gift from the father to the son executed by delivery of the goods in question to the son." | Lord FitzGerald; Sir Barnes Peacock; Sir Richard Couch; Sir Arthur Hobhouse | Appeal dismissed | Supreme Court of Canada |
| Elliott and others v. Lord and others | [1883] UKPC 10 | "This is an appeal from a judgment of the Court of Queen's Bench for Lower Canada, in the Province of Quebec (Appeal Side), in an action by the Appellants against the Respondents to recover damages in the nature of demurrage for the detention of the Appellants' ship, the 'Gresham', at Sydney, Nova Scotia, whither she had gone to load under a charter party dated the 12th of June 1872. Mr Justice Torrance, as the Judge of the Superior Court for Lower Canada, Province of Quebec, District of Montreal, on the 21st of May 1880, decided that the 'Gresham' was unduly detained for 17 days, and condemned the Defendants in 850l. damages, with interest and costs." | Lord Blackburn; Sir Barnes Peacock; Sir Robert P. Collier; Sir Richard Couch; Sir Arthur Hobhouse | Appeal allowed | Quebec Court of Queen's Bench (Appeal Side) |
| Caldwell and another v. McLaren | [1883] UKPC 12 | "In the case of Prince v. Gagnon, from the Supreme Court of the Dominion of Canada, their Lordships said they were not prepared to advise Her Majesty to exercise Her Prerogative or admit an appeal to Her Majesty in Council from the Supreme Court of the Dominion, save where the case was of gravity involving matters of public interest or some important question of law or affecting property of considerable amount, or where the case was otherwise of some public importance or of a very substantial character. Their Lordships think that this case falls entirely within the rule there laid down." | Sir Barnes Peacock; Sir Robert P. Collier; Sir Richard Couch; Sir Arthur Hobhouse | Appeal allowed | Supreme Court of Canada |
| Carter v. Molson | [1883] UKPC 23 | "This is an appeal from a judgment of the Court of Queen's Bench for Lower Canada, in the Province of Quebec; by which that Court by a majority of three to two, reversed a judgment of the Superior Court of Lower Canada. ... The question, which their Lordships have found to be one of considerable difficulty, depends on the true construction of the two codes of Lower Canada, the Civil Code, more particularly Art. 2274 and Arts. 2613 and 2614, and the Code of Civil Procedure, more particularly Art. 766 and those following it, and Art. 1360." | Lord Blackburn; Sir Barnes Peacock; Sir Richard Couch; Sir Arthur Hobhouse | Appeal dismissed | Quebec Court of Queen's Bench (Appeal Side) |
| Mott and others v. Lockhart and others | [1883] UKPC 32 | "The proceedings which gave rise to this appeal were commenced in the Court of the Commissioner of Public Works and Mines, who gave judgment on the 19th of May 1881 in favour of the Appellants. On the 1st of May 1882 the Supreme Court of Nova Scotia reversed that judgment, and their decision is now under appeal." | Lord Watson; Sir Barnes Peacock; Sir Robert P. Collier; Sir Arthur Hobhouse | Appeal allowed | Supreme Court of Nova Scotia |
| The Canada Central Railway Co v. Murray et al. | [1883] UKPC 34 | "Their Lordships are of opinion that this application ought to be refused. This case made by the Petitioners, the Railway Company, is that they were not liable to the Plaintiff Thomas Murray as having employed him to make certain fencing along the line. They allege that the contract was made with a gentleman of the name of Foster, who was not only a servant of the Company, but a contractor with the Company, dealing with them as an independent contractor." | Lord Watson; Sir Barnes Peacock; Sir Robert P. Collier; Sir Richard Couch; Sir Arthur Hobhouse | Appeal dismissed | Supreme Court of Canada |
| The Canada Southern Railway Co. v. The International Bridge Co. | [1883] UKPC 35 | "Their Lordships have considered the arguments addressed to them by the learned Counsel for the Appellants, and they do not think it necessary to hear further argument upon the case, being of opinion that the decree of the Court of Appeal appealed from is correct. Their Lordships think that no error has been committed by the Appellants in their statement of substantial questions in their printed case." | Lord Selborne, Lord Chancellor; Sir Barnes Peacock; Sir Richard Couch | Appeal dismissed | Court of Appeal for Ontario |
| Macdonald v. Whitfield | [1883] UKPC 41 | "Edward Macdonald and George Whitfield, who are respectively Appellant and Respondent in this appeal, were, in the year 1875, directors of a trading corporation known as the St. John's Stone China Ware Company, which carried on business at St. John's, in the district of Iberville and province of Quebec. At that time the concern was not in a very prosperous condition, and in the month of July 1875, the balance due by the Company in its account current with the Merchants' Bank of Canada was upwards of $17,000. The Appellant was President and Chairman of the Board of Directors; and he had endorsed the Company's promissory notes, for its accommodation, to the Merchants' Bank, to the amount of $65,000." | Lord Watson; Sir Barnes Peacock; Sir Robert P. Collier; Sir Arthur Hobhouse | Appeal allowed | Quebec Court of Queen's Bench (Appeal Side) |
| Attorney General of Ontario v Mercer | [1883] UKPC 42 | "The question to be determined in this case is, whether lands in the Province of Ontario, escheated to the Crown for defect of heirs, 'belong' (in the sense in which the verb is used in the 'British North America Act 1867') to the Province of Ontario or to the Dominion of Canada. By the Imperial Statute 31 Geo. III., cap. 31, Sect. 43, it was provided that all lands which should be thereafter granted, within the Province of Upper Canada (now Ontario), should be granted in free and common soccage, in like manner as lands were then holden in free and common soccage in England. The argument before their Lordships, on both sides, proceeded upon the assumption that the lands now in question were so holden." | **Lord Selborne, Lord Chancellor**; Sir Barnes Peacock; Sir Montague E. Smith; Sir Robert P. Collier; Sir Richard Couch; Sir Arthur Hobhouse | Appeal allowed | Supreme Court of Canada |
| Emery and others v. Cichero, Ships Bunin and Arklow | [1883] UKPC 47 | "The case presented on behalf of the 'Bunin,' the complaining vessel below, was as follows: That on the 30th March 1881, as she was proceeding on a voyage from Havre to Baltimore, at 2 o’clock in the morning, the weather being dark but clear and the wind from the north-west, she was steering a course south-west by west half west close hauled on the starboard tack; that her lights were properly burning; and that she was proceeding at the rate of 6½ knots an hour when the red light of a ship, which proved to be the 'Arklow,' was seen on the starboard bow. That she, the 'Bunin,' kept her course; but that the 'Arklow,' by some unaccountable mismanagement, as it is stated, ran into the 'Bunin,' striking her about the fore rigging in the starboard side with her stern." | Lord FitzGerald; Sir Barnes Peacock; Sir Robert P. Collier; Sir James Hannen; Sir Arthur Hobhouse | Appeal allowed | Vice-Admiralty Court of New Brunswick |
| Ducondu and others v. Dupuy | [1883] UKPC 51 | "On the 10th July 1858 Edward Scallon, who is the predecessor in title of the Appellants, contracted with one Benjamin Peck, the predecessor in title of the Respondent, to sell to him certain property called timber limits." | Sir Barnes Peacock; Sir Montague E. Smith; Sir Arthur Hobhouse | Appeal allowed | Supreme Court of Canada |
| Colonial Building and Investment Association v Attorney General of Quebec | [1883] UKPC 54 | "This is an appeal from a judgment of the Court of Queen's Bench of the Province of Quebec, reversing a judgment of the Superior Court, which dismissed the petition of the Attorney-General of the province, praying that it be declared that the appellant company had been illegally incorporated, and that it be ordered to be dissolved, and prohibited from acting as a corporation." | Lord FitzGerald; Sir Barnes Peacock; **Sir Montague E. Smith**; Sir Robert P. Collier; Sir Richard Couch; Sir Arthur Hobhouse | Appeal allowed | Quebec Court of Queen's Bench (Appeal Side) |
| Hodge v. The Queen | [1883] UKPC 59 | "The Appellant, Archibald Hodge, the proprietor of a tavern known as the St. James' Hotel, in the city of Toronto, and who, on the 7th May 1881, was the holder of a license for the retail of spirituous liquors in his tavern, and also licensed to keep a billiard saloon, was summoned before the Police Magistrate of Toronto, for a breach of the Resolutions of the License Commissioners of Toronto, and was convicted on evidence sufficient to sustain the conviction if the magistrate had authority in law to make it." | Lord FitzGerald; **Sir Barnes Peacock**; Sir Robert P. Collier; Sir Richard Couch; Sir Arthur Hobhouse | Appeal dismissed | Court of Appeal for Ontario |
| McLaren v. Caldwell | [1884] UKPC 21 | "In this case the now Respondent, as Plaintiff, filed in the Court of Chancery, Ontario, on the 4th May 1880, a bill of complaint, and Appellants, as Defendants, filed an answer on the 11th August 1880. Issues of fact were raised, and evidence was heard at great length before Vice-Chancellor Proudfoot, who on the 16th December 1880, pronounced this judgment ..." | Lord Blackburn; Sir Barnes Peacock; Sir Robert P. Collier; Sir Richard Couch; Sir Arthur Hobhouse | Appeal allowed | Supreme Court of Canada |
| The Queen v. Doutre | [1884] UKPC 34 | "On the 1st October 1875, the Government of Canada addressed and sent to the Respondent, Joseph Doutre, a letter, signed by Mr Bernard, the Deputy Minister of Justice, in the following terms:– [requesting Doutre, a lawyer, to act in a matter]. Upon receipt of this letter, the Respondent wrote, in reply, that he would act as requested." | Lord Watson; Sir Barnes Peacock; Sir Robert P. Collier; Sir Richard Couch; Sir Arthur Hobhouse | Appeal dismissed | Supreme Court of Canada |
| Canada Central Railway Company v. McLaren | [1884] UKPC 37 | "The Appellants are the proprietors of a railway which passes through the village of Carlton Place, in the province of Ontario, situated on the north bank of the River Mississippi. The respondent is a timber merchant, and in the course of his business he brings large quantities of wood, in rafts, to Carlton Place, which are there converted into sawn lumber, and, when thoroughly dried, are sent to market along the Appellants' railway. For many years prior to the origin of the present litigation, the Respondent had, with the leave of the Appellants, been in use to pile his sawn lumber on the Appellants' land, with a view to its being conveniently loaded or 'shipped' in railway cars, for conveyance to market. The piles, which were stacked on both sides of the line, were 17 or 18 feet in height, from a foot to a foot and a half apart, and the face of each pile was not more than six feet distant from the nearest rail used for Appellants ordinary traffic. On the 27th May 1879 a fire broke out in one of the piles on the east side of the Appellants' main line, and, spreading rapidly, destroyed a great quantity of lumber and plant belonging to the Respondent. On the 3rd October 1879 the Respondent instituted an action against the Appellants, for recovery of the damages thus sustained by him, upon the allegation that the fire had been caused by the escape of sparks, or burning matter, from one of the Appellants' locomotives, in consequence either of its having been negligently and unskilfully managed, or of its having been insufficiently and improperly constructed." | Lord Watson; Sir Barnes Peacock; Sir Robert P. Collier; Sir Richard Couch; Sir Arthur Hobhouse | Appeal dismissed | Court of Appeal for Ontario |
| Attorney General for Quebec v Reed | [1884] UKPC 44 | "Their Lordships have considered the argument which they have heard, and they have come to the conclusion that the judgment appealed from must be affirmed. The points to be considered are three; first of all, can this charge upon exhibits used in the Courts of Justice of the province be justified under the 2nd sub-section of clause 92 of the British North America Act? Is it a case of direct taxation within the province 'in order to the raising of a revenue for provincial purposes?' What is the meaning of the words 'direct taxation?' | **Lord Selborne, Lord Chancellor**; Lord FitzGerald; Sir Montague E. Smith; Sir Robert P. Collier | Appeal dismissed | Supreme Court of Canada |
| The Exchange Bank of Yarmouth v. Blethen | [1885] UKPC 7 | "The action in which the present appeal arises was brought by the Exchange Bank of Yarmouth, the endorsees of two promissory notes, against Mr. Blethen, a prior endorsee. The notes were made, one by Messrs. Dennis and Doane, the other by Mr. Doane alone, payable to the order of the Defendant. The Defendant endorsed them to a firm of 'Viels and Dennis,' who endorsed them to the Plaintiffs. The defence to the action was that the Plaintiffs had released the makers of the notes, and therefore also the Defendant." | Lord Blackburn; Sir Barnes Peacock; Sir Robert P. Collier; Sir Richard Couch; Sir Arthur Hobhouse | Appeal dismissed | Supreme Court of Nova Scotia |
| Connor v. The Queen | [1885] UKPC 36 | "It appears from the statement of Mr. Jeune, which is concurred in by the Crown, to be very doubtful whether there is any Petitioner at their Lordships' bar; and it does not appear to be expedient to have a discussion upon this petition until that fact be ascertained. If the fact be as indicated by Mr. Jeune, that may relieve counsel for the Petitioner of a somewhat difficult task. The rule of this Board is not to entertain any appeal in criminal cases unless in very exceptional circumstances. In this case the Petitioner had the advantage of having the objections taken to his sentence fully considered and disposed of by a very competent tribunal. Their Lordships have thought it to be their duty to examine very carefully the statements made in the petition, and they also think it right to state that the reason disclosed by that document are not primâ facie such as would induce them to grant leave to appeal." | Lord Watson; Lord Monkswell; Lord Hobhouse; Sir Barnes Peacock; Sir Richard Couch | Appeal dismissed | Manitoba Queen's Bench |
| Riel v Her Majesty the Queen | [1885] UKPC 37 | "This is a petition of Louis Riel, tried in July last in Regina, in the North-West Territories of Canada, and convicted of high treason, and sentenced to death, for leave to appeal against an order of the Queen's Bench of Manitoba confirming that conviction." | Lord Halsbury, Lord Chancellor; Lord Fitzgerald; Lord Monkswell; Lord Hobhouse; Lord Esher; Sir Barnes Peacock | Application for leave to appeal dismissed | Manitoba Queen's Bench |
| Parker v. Kenny | [1885] UKPC 39 | "Their Lordships do not think it necessary to hear Counsel for the Respondents (Defendants in Court below). This is an Appeal from a decision of the Supreme Court of Nova Scotia, dated the 26th April 1884, dismissing the Appellant's appeal and affirming the decision of the Equity Judge on the primary hearing. The character in which the Plaintiff sues is as assignee of one Edward Morrison, an insolvent." | Lord FitzGerald; Lord Monkswell; Lord Hobhouse; Sir Barnes Peacock; Sir Richard Couch | Appeal dismissed | Supreme Court of Nova Scotia |
| The Colonial Bank v. The Exchange Bank of Yarmouth | [1885] UKPC 41 | "The question in this case is whether the sum of three thousand dollars in dispute was received by the Defendants under such circumstances that they are to be held to have received it to the use of the Plaintiffs, the Plaintiffs being the Appellants and the Defendants the Respondents in this Appeal. The Plaintiffs have to show that the money was not received by the Defendants to their own use; that there was privity between them; and that the Plaintiffs occupied such a relation to the Defendants that they are entitled to recall the money out of the Defendants' hands into their own. That the money was received by the Defendants, not to their own use, but by mistake, is a matter not now disputed. For the decision of the other questions it is necessary to state at some little length the material facts of the case." | Lord Monkswell; Lord Hobhouse; Sir Barnes Peacock; Sir Richard Couch | Appeal allowed | Supreme Court of Nova Scotia |
| Exchange Bank of Canada and others v. The Queen | [1886] UKPC 8 | "The sole ultimate question in this case is whether the Crown, being an ordinary creditor of the Bank which has been put in liquidation, is entitled to priority of payment over its other ordinary creditors. That again depends on the question how the two Codes of Lower Canada are to be construed. Their Lordships think it clear, not only that the Crown is bound by the Codes, but that the subject of priorities is exhaustively dealt with by them, so that the Crown can claim no priority except what is allowed by them. If so, the other points which have been elaborately treated both in the colony and here are only of subsidiary importance, though undoubtedly they have a bearing on the construction of the Codes." | Lord FitzGerald; Lord Monkswell; Lord Hobhouse; Sir Richard Couch | Appeal allowed | Quebec Court of Queen's Bench (Appeal Side) |
| The Grand Trunk Railway Company of Canada v. Peart | [1886] UKPC 13 | "Their Lordships do not think it necessary to call upon the counsel for the Respondents. It is not necessary at all for their Lordships to express any opinion further than on the question whether the verdict was against the weight of evidence. Of course if there was no evidence at all there should be a non-suit. Their Lordships will not attempt to define, when on a question of contributory negligence, it is within the province of the Judge to non-suit, and they do not think it would be right to discuss it further; for if there was evidence here at all to go to the jury upon the important issues in the case, and that evidence was such as to make the verdict found for the Plaintiff not against the weight of evidence, it follows of course that this was not a case in which the Judge should have taken upon himself to have directed a non-suit." | Lord Herschell, Lord Chancellor; Lord Blackburn; Sir Richard Couch | Appeal dismissed | Court of Appeal for Ontario |
| Attorney General of Nova Scotia v. Gregory | [1886] UKPC 28 | "In this case Mr. Gregory obtained a verdict against the Halifax Company for eighty thousand dollars after a trial in the Supreme Court of Nova Scotia. The Company appealed to the Supreme Court of Canada, and the only real question was, whether forty thousand dollars of the eighty thousand should be paid to Mr. Hill instead of being paid to Mr. Gregory the Plaintiff. It was a matter of indifference to the Company whether they paid Hill or Gregory. Therefore, the Company appealing were really acting on behalf of Hill, and it is agreed that Hill represented the Government of Nova Scotia, who now appear by their Attorney General." | Lord Blackburn; Lord Hobhouse; Sir Richard Couch | Appeal dismissed | Supreme Court of Canada |
| The Windsor and Annapolis Railway Company v. The Queen and Western Counties Railway Company | [1886] UKPC 30 | "The Government of Canada, by an agreement dated the 22nd September 1871, undertook to give the Appellant Company the exclusive use of the Windsor Branch railway, and also running powers over the trunk line, from Windsor Junction to Halifax, for the term of 21 years, from the 1st January 1872. The Appellant Company, in pursuance of that agreement, entered upon and worked the Windsor Branch Railway until the 1st August 1877, when Mr. Brydges, the Government Superintendent of Railways, took possession of the line, and put an end to the occupation of the Company. On the 24th September 1877, the same official gave possession of the line to the Western Counties Railway Company, under an arrangement, the terms of which are to be found in Schedules A and B of the Act of the Dominion Parliament, 37th Vict., c. 16." | Lord Watson; Lord Halsbury; Lord Hobhouse; Sir Barnes Peacock; Sir Montague E. Smith; Sir Richard Couch | Appeal allowed | Supreme Court of Canada |
| Lewin and another v. Wilson and others | [1886] UKPC 31 | "On the 27th September 1850 John Howe and James White gave a joint and several bond to secure the payment of 1,000l. to Margaret Cunningham on the 27th September 1855, with interest quarterly until payment of the principal. As between Howe and White the latter was a surety, but they were both principal debtors to the obligee." | Lord Watson; Lord Hobhouse; Sir Barnes Peacock; Sir Richard Couch | Appeal allowed | Supreme Court of Canada |
| Octave Chavigny de la Chevrotière v. La Cité de Montréal | [1886] UKPC 47 | "The action from which this appeal arises was commenced in the Superior Court of the province of Quebec, Lower Canada. The demandant, who is also the Appellant, claimed to be proprietor of about seven-eights of that part of the city of Montreal which from 1803 to January 1847 had been a public market, and from January 1847 to the present time has been an open public place in the city, known as the Place Jacques Cartier. The demandant claimed against the Respondents, the city of Montreal, a right to resume possession of that piece of land as in the original ownership of the grantors. His money claim against the city amounted to 180,866 dollars. Further, he claimed that the original deed of grant of 29th December 1813 should be brought in and declared null and void. The claim is said to have arisen under that deed so often referred to in the course of the case." | **Lord FitzGerald**; Lord Hobhouse; Sir Barnes Peacock; Sir Richard Couch | Appeal dismissed | Quebec Court of Queen's Bench (Appeal Side) |
| Mary Elizabeth Allen and John Henry Allen v. The Quebec Warehouse Company | [1886] UKPC 48 | "This is an appeal by Mary Elizabeth Allen and John Henry Allen, her husband, Plaintiffs in an action brought by them against the Quebec Warehouse Company, to recover damages for an injury sustained by a ship belonging to the female Plaintiff in the month of November 1880." | Lord FitzGerald; Lord Herschell; Sir Barnes Peacock | Appeal dismissed | Quebec Court of Queen's Bench (Appeal Side) |
| The Owners of the Thomas Allen v. Gow and others | [1886] UKPC 51 | "This is an appeal from a decision of the Judge of the Vice Admiralty Court, at Halifax, Nova Scotia, in an action for salvage, on the ground that the sum awarded by the learned Judge is excessive." | Lord Herschell; Sir Barnes Peacock; Sir James Hannen | Appeal dismissed | Vice Admiralty Court, Nova Scotia |
| Price v. Neault | [1886] UKPC 52 | "In this case the Plaintiff, who is also the Appellant, seeks to recover a plot of land in the possession of the Defendant, and the question is whether transactions which passed between the Plaintiff and his agents on the one hand, and the Defendant and his predecessors in title on the other, are such as to preclude the Plaintiff from recovering the land. The Defendant, now Respondent, has not appeared on the appeal, so that their Lordships are under the disadvantage of deciding the case on an ex parte hearing." | Lord Bramwell; **Lord Hobhouse**; Lord Herschell; Sir Barnes Peacock; Sir Richard Couch | Appeal dismissed | Quebec Court of Queen's Bench (Appeal Side) |
| Dumoulin v. Langtry and others | [1887] UKPC 24 | "In disposing of this petition their Lordships do not think it necessary to raise any questions regarding the interest and right of the petitioners to insist in the action. They will assume that the petitioners have a locus standi, and that the point was rightly decided by the judges of the Supreme Court of Canada. The question of law involved in the action are, no doubt, of considerable importance to the litigants who are represented at the Bar; and are also calculated to attract the attention of the public. At the same time their Lordships cannot regard these questions as being of general importance in the strict and proper sense of that term. Their determination, one way or another, will not affect other interests than those of the parties to the action. It will not be decisive of any general principle of law." | Lord Watson; Lord FitzGerald; Lord Hobhouse; Sir Barnes Peacock; Sir Richard Couch | Appeal dismissed | Supreme Court of Canada |
| The Bank of Montreal v. Sweeny | [1887] UKPC 25 | "Their Lordships consider it to be proved in this case that Rose held the disputed shares upon a trust not disclosed by the entry in the Company's books; that he transferred them to the Bank in breach of his trust; that at the time of the transfer the Bank knew of Rose's position; and that the Plaintiff turns out to be the person in whose favour the trust existed. It has been argued for the Appellants that these things are not proved, because they require a written commencement de prevue, and have not got it. But on this point their Lordships stopped the Respondent's Counsel. They are quite clear that if a written commencement is needed, it is to be found in the letters of Crawford and Lockhart coupled with the books of the Rolling Mills Company, and in the transfer executed by Rose to Buchanan on the 3rd June 1876." | Lord Halsbury, Lord Chancellor; Lord Hobhouse; Lord Macnaghten; Sir Barnes Peacock; Sir Richard Couch | Appeal dismissed | Supreme Court of Canada |
| Bank of Toronto v. Lambe | [1887] UKPC 30 | "These appeals raise one of the many difficult questions which have come up for judicial decision under those provisions of the British North America Act 1867 which apportion legislative powers between the Parliament of the Dominion and the Legislatures of the Provinces. It is undoubtedly a case of great constitutional importance, as the Appellants' Counsel have earnestly impressed upon their Lordships. But questions of this class have been left for the decision of the ordinary courts of law, who must treat the provisions of the Act in question by the same methods of constriction and exposition which they apply to other statutes. A number of incorporated Companies are resisting payment of a tax imposed by the Legislature of Quebec, and four of them are the present Appellants. It will be convenient first to deal with the case of the Bank of Toronto, which was argued first." | Lord Hobhouse; Lord Macnaghten; Sir Barnes Peacock; Sir Richard Baggallay; Sir Richard Couch | Appeal dismissed | Quebec Court of Queen's Bench (Appeal Side) |
| The North-West Transportation Company and James Hughes Beatty v. Henry Beatty and others | [1887] UKPC 39 | "The action, in which this appeal has been brought, was commenced, on the 31st May 1883, in the Chancery Division of the High Court of Justice of Ontario. The Plaintiff, Henry Beatty, is a shareholder in the North-West Transportation Company, Limited, and he sues on behalf of himself and all other shareholders in the Company, except those who are Defendants. The Defendants are the Company and five shareholders, who, at the commencement of the action were the Directors of the Company. The claim in the action is to set aside a sale made to the Company by James Hughes Beatty, one of the Directors, of a steamer called the 'United Empire', of which previously to such sale he was sole owner." | Lord Hobhouse; Sir Barnes Peacock; Sir Richard Baggallay; Sir Richard Couch | Appeal allowed | Supreme Court of Canada |
| Corporation of Parkdale v. West and others | [1887] UKPC 41 | "The facts in these consolidated appeals are few, and not in dispute. Parkdale is the western suburb of Toronto, and a separate Municipality. The boundary between the two Municipalities is Dufferin Street, which runs north and south, and intersects at right angles a public highway called Queen Street, 66 feet wide, and one of the leading thoroughfares connecting Toronto with Parkdale. The Respondents are the owners and occupiers of property fronting Queen Street, near the point of intersection, the property in the one case being in Toronto, in the other in Parkdale. At the date of the commencement of the operation which led to this litigation, Queen Street was crossed on the level at the point of its intersection with Dufferin Street by the main lines of four Railway Companies." | Lord Hobhouse; Lord Macnaghten; Sir Barnes Peacock; Sir Richard Couch | Appeal dismissed | Supreme Court of Canada |
| Cossman v. West and British North America Assurance Company | [1887] UKPC 43 | "These are consolidated appeals from two judgements of the Supreme Court of Nova Scotia in actions in which the Appellant was the Plaintiff. The action against West was upon a time policy of insurance of the Ocean Marine Assurance Association, dated 28th November 1881, for $4,000, upon the barque 'L.E. Cann,' a British ship valued at $10,000, from the 28th November 1881 to the 28th November 1882." | Lord Bramwell; Lord Hobhouse; Lord Macnaghten; Sir Barnes Peacock; Sir Richard Couch | Appeal allowed | Supreme Court of Nova Scotia |
| Redfield, Farwell, and McIntyre v. The Corporation of Wickham | [1888] UKPC 13 | "The Respondent Corporation became subscribers for stock in the Richleieu, Drummond, and Arthabaska Counties Railway Company, which was incorporated by the Quebec Act, 32 Vict., c. 56, under an agreement by which the Company undertook to construct their line of railway so that it should pass through the municipality of the township of Wickham." | **Lord Watson**; Lord Hobhouse; Lord Macnaghten; Sir Barnes Peacock; Sir Richard Couch | Appeal dismissed | Quebec Court of Queen's Bench (Appeal Side) |
| Rolland v. Cassidy | [1888] UKPC 34 | "Their Lordships do not think it necessary in this case to call upon the Counsel for the Respondents. The question arises under a reference to arbitration of the accounts of a partnership constituted in the year 1874, for the purpose of certain speculation in lumber of which either the whole or a considerable part had been previously bought by the co-partners." | **The Earl of Selborne**; Lord Hobhouse; Lord Macnaghten; Sir Barnes Peacock; Sir Richard Couch | Appeal dismissed | Quebec Court of Queen's Bench (Appeal Side) |
| Kennedy v. Purcell | [1888] UKPC 42 | "This petition gives rise to a question of considerable importance. The decision complained of has been made under the provisions of the Canadian Controverted Elections Acts; and it will be convenient to refer briefly to those provisions of the Acts on which the judgement of their Lordships is mainly rested." | **Lord Hobhouse**; Lord Macnaghten; Sir Barnes Peacock; Sir Richard Couch | Appeal dismissed | Supreme Court of Canada |
| Dunn and others v. Lareau | [1888] UKPC 44 | "The subject of controversy in this appeal is a parcel of land forming part of the 8th concession of the Seigniorie de Monnoir, which consists of a strip of ground of uniform breadth lying north and south. It was originally laid off in 36 lots bounded by parallel lines running east and west numbered consecutively from 92, the north most to 126 the south most lot." | **Lord Watson**; Sir Barnes Peacock; Sir Richard Couch | Appeal dismissed | Quebec Court of Queen's Bench (Appeal Side) |
| Allan and others v. Pratt | [1888] UKPC 47 | "Their Lordships are of opinion that the appeal is incompetent. The proper measure of value for determining the question of the right of appeal is, in their judgement, the amount which has been recovered by the Plaintiff in the action and against which the appeal could be brought." | **The Earl of Selborne**; Lord Watson; Lord Hobhouse; Sir Barnes Peacock | Appeal dismissed | Quebec Court of Queen's Bench (Appeal Side) |
| Singleton, Dann, and Company v. Knight and others | [1888] UKPC 50 | "This is an appeal from a judgment of the Court of Queen's Bench for the Province of Quebec, Appeal side, affirming a judgment of the Superior Court by which the action of the Plaintiffs, the now Appellants, was dismissed with costs. There are therefore two concurrent judgments upon the question at issue between the parties." | The Earl of Selborne; Lord Watson; Lord Hobhouse; **Sir Barnes Peacock**; Mr. S. Woulfe Flanagan | Appeal dismissed | Quebec Court of Queen's Bench (Appeal Side) |
| Grand Trunk Railway Company of Canada v. Jennings | [1888] UKPC 54 | "This appeal is taken in an action brought by the Respondent in the Court of Queen's Bench, Ontario, for damages in respect of the death of her husband, the late William Jennings; her right to recover being founded upon cap. 135 of the Consolidated Statutes of Ontario, secs. 2 and 3, which are expressed in substantially the same terms with the first and second sections of the English Statute, 9 & 10 Vict. C. 93, commonly known as Lord Campbell's Act. The deceased, who was a healthy man, 41 years of age, lost his life on the 10th August 1885, through the negligence of the Appellants' servants." | The Earl of Selborne; **Lord Watson**; Lord Hobhouse; Sir Barnes Peacock | Appeal dismissed | Court of Appeal for Ontario |
| St. Catherine's Milling and Lumber Company v. The Queen on the Information of the Attorney General for the Province of Ontario | [1888] UKPC 70 | "On the 3rd October 1873, a formal Treaty, or contract, was concluded between Commissioners appointed by the Government of the Dominion of Canada on behalf of Her Majesty the Queen of the one part, and a number of Chiefs and Headmen duly chosen to represent the Salteaux tribe of Ojibbeway Indians, of the other part, by which the latter, for certain considerations, released and surrendered to the Government of the Dominion, for Her Majesty and her successors, the whole right and title of the Indian inhabitants whom they represented, to a tract of country upwards of fifty thousand square miles in extent." | The Earl of Selborne; **Lord Watson**; Lord Hobhouse; Sir Barnes Peacock; Sir Montague E. Smith; Sir Richard Couch | Appeal dismissed | Supreme Court of Canada |
| The Attorney General of British Columbia v. The Attorney General of Canada | [1889] UKPC 13 | "The question involved in this appeal is one of considerable interest to the parties, but it will be found to lie within a very narrow compass, when the facts, as to which there is no dispute, are explained. By an Order in Council, dated the 16th May 1871, Her Majesty, in pursuance of the enactments of Section 146 of the 'British North America Act, 1867,' was pleased to ordain that the Province of British Columbia should, from the 29th day of July following, be admitted into and form part of the Dominion of Canada, subject to the provisions of that Act and to certain Articles of Union which had been duly sanctioned by the Parliaments of Canada and by the Legislature of British Columbia." | Lord Halsbury, Lord Chancellor; **Lord Watson**; Lord FitzGerald; Lord Hobhouse; Lord Macnaghten | Appeal allowed | Supreme Court of Canada |
| Robert McMillan v. The Grand Trunk Railway Company of Canada | [1889] UKPC 27 | "With regard to applications like the present, the following rules were laid down by this Board in the case of Prince v. Gagnon (8 Appeal Cases, 103), 'Their Lordships are not prepared to advise Her Majesty to exercise her prerogative be admitting an appeal to Her Majesty in Council from the Supreme Court of the Dominion, save where the case is of gravity, involving matter of public interest, or some important question of law, or affecting property of considerable amount, or where the case is otherwise of some public importance of a very substantial character'." | **Lord Watson**; Sir Barnes Peacock; Sir Richard Couch | Appeal dismissed | Supreme Court of Canada |
| La Cité de Montréal v. Les Ecclésiastiques du Séminaire de St. Sulpice | [1889] UKPC 35 | "This is a petition at the instance of the Municipal Corporation of the City of Montreal, for leave to appeal from a judgment of the Supreme Court of Canada, by which the Seminary of St. Sulpice, which is within the boundaries of the city, has been exempted from payment of a sum of $361 90, about 70l. sterling, being the proportion charged upon it, by the petitioners, of a special assessment made by them for constructing a main drain which runs in front of its premises. The Supreme Court, by a majority of four to one (Ritchie, C.J., being the dissentient Judge), reversed the decision of the Queen's Bench for Lower Canada, which was also pronounced by a majority of four to one, and restored the judgment of Loranger, J., the Judge of First Instance." | **Lord Watson**; Lord Hobhouse; Sir Barnes Peacock; Sir Richard Couch | Appeal dismissed | Supreme Court of Canada |
| McDougall v. McGreevy | [1889] UKPC 40 | "The Respondent McGreevy being the owner of one thousand $100 shares in the North Shore Railway Company, and being unable to pay a call of 50 per cent. which had been made upon them on the 14th September 1882, transferred them to the Appellant, who was also a shareholder in the Company, and took from him a letter of that date, in which it was stated that the transfer had been made with the express condition that McGreevy would have the right to redeem the stock within two months from that date by paying 50 per cent. of the nominal amount of the shares, that is to say, fifty thousand dollars, and any further call on the same that might be paid 'within said delay,' with interest on such amount. On the 13th November 1882 McGreevey by his notary made a formal tender to McDougall of $51,125, being $50,000 and interest thereon at 6 per cent., and McDougall refused to receive the amount." | Lord Watson; Lord Hobhouse; **Sir Richard Couch** | Appeal allowed | Quebec Court of Queen's Bench (Appeal Side) |
| The Corporation of the Town of St. John and another v. The Central Vermont Railway Company | [1889] UKPC 43 | 'By the Quebec Act, 44 Vict., cap. 62, which amends and consolidates previous statutes relating to the incorporation of the town of St. John’s, Appellant Corporation is (Section 86) authorized to levy annually on all lands, town lots, and parts of town lots within the municipality, with the buildings and erections thereon, a sum not exceeding one half cent in the dollar on their whole real value as entered on the assessment roll of the town." | **Lord Watson**; Lord Bramwell; Lord Hobhouse; Sir Barnes Peacock; Sir Richard Couch | Appeal dismissed | Supreme Court of Canada |
| Gilmour and others v. Mauroit | [1889] UKPC 47 | "In this case the Superior Court issued an order enjoining the Defendants, who are the now Appellants, to discontinue and cease all lumbering and other works in connection there-with on certain lots of land in the possession of the Complainant, who is now Respondent." | Lord Halsbury, Lord Chancellor; **Lord Hobhouse**; Lord Macnaghten; Sir Richard Couch | Appeal dismissed | Quebec Court of Queen's Bench (Appeal Side) |
| Gilmour and others v. Allaire | [1889] UKPC 48 | "This appeal is subject to the same conditions, the only difference being that the Plaintiff's location ticket was granted before the Proclamation of September 1883, and before the Defendants obtained any timber license at all. Therefore the arguments used to prove the invalidity of Mauroit's title do not apply to Allaire's. This appeal should also be dismissed with costs." | Lord Halsbury, Lord Chancellor; **Lord Hobhouse**; Lord Macnaghten; Sir Richard Couch | Appeal dismissed | Quebec Court of Queen's Bench (Appeal Side) |
| Senécal (now by Order of Revivor his widow) v. Pauzé | [1889] UKPC 49 | "In this case their Lordships are of opinion that the judgment of the Court of Queen's Bench ought to be affirmed. It appears that, on the 31st of January 1880, one Pangman deposited with Senécal 54 debentures of the Laurentian Railway Company of the nominal value of $500 each as collateral security for the payment of two promissory notes of the same date of $1000 each, payable the one 10 months and the other 12 months after date." | Lord Watson; Lord Hobhouse; **Lord Macnaghten**; Sir Barnes Peacock; Sir Richard Couch | Appeal dismissed | Quebec Court of Queen's Bench (Appeal Side) |
| Susan McMullan alias Millen v. Dame Jane Wadsworth | [1889] UKPC 50 | "The question to be determined in this case is whether James Wadsworth, by his marriage in September 1828 with Margaret Quigley, widow of James McMullen, subjected himself to the legal community of property as then established in Lower Canada." | Lord Watson; Lord Hobhouse; **Sir Barnes Peacock**; Sir Richard Couch | Appeal dismissed | Supreme Court of Canada |
| The North Shore Railway Company v. Pion and others | [1889] UKPC 52 | "The Appellants in this case are a Canadian Railway Company, against whom an action was brought by the Respondents, tanners at Quebec, in October 1883. The Respondents carried on their business upon riparian land belonging to them, which had a frontage of considerable length to the St. Charles, a tidal navigable river within the limits of the Harbour of Quebec." | **The Earl of Selborne**; Lord Watson; Lord Bramwell; Lord Hobhouse; Sir Richard Couch | Appeal dismissed | Supreme Court of Canada |

== Summary by year and result ==
| Year | Number of Cases | Appeal Allowed | | Appeal Dismissed | |
|---|---|---|---|---|---|
| 1880 | 5 | 2 | 40.0% | 3 | 60.0% |
| 1881 | 3 | 2 | 66.7% | 1 | 33.3% |
| 1882 | 5 | 2 | 40.0% | 3 | 60% |
| 1883 | 11 | 7 | 63.6% | 4 | 36.4% |
| 1884 | 4 | 1 | 25.0% | 3 | 75.0% |
| 1885 | 5 | 1 | 20.0% | 4 | 80.0% |
| 1886 | 9 | 3 | 33.3% | 6 | 66.7% |
| 1887 | 6 | 2 | 33.3% | 4 | 66.7% |
| 1888 | 8 | 0 | 0.0% | 8 | 100.0% |
| 1889 | 10 | 2 | 20.0% | 8 | 80.0% |
| Total Cases | 66 | 22 | 33.3% | 44 | 66.7% |
| Yearly Averages | 6.6 | 2.2 | | 4.4 | |

== Summary by jurisdiction and court appealed from ==
| Jurisdiction | Number of Appeals | On Appeal from Supreme Court of Canada | | On Appeal from Other Courts | |
|---|---|---|---|---|---|
| Federal | 3 | 3 | 100.0% | 0 | 0.0% |
| Ontario | 17 | 12 | 70.6% | 5 | 29.4% |
| Quebec | 31 | 8 | 25.8% | 23 | 74.2% |
| Nova Scotia | 8 | 1 | 12.5% | 7 | 87.5% |
| New Brunswick | 5 | 3 | 60.0% | 2 | 40.0% |
| Manitoba | 1 | 0 | 0.0% | 1 | 100.0% |
| British Columbia | 0 | 0 | 0.0% | 0 | 0.0% |
| Prince Edward Island | 0 | 0 | 0.0% | 0 | 0.0% |
| North-West Territories (Note: There was one case from the North-West Territories which went on appeal to the Manitoba Queen's Bench, since there was no appellate court in the North-West Territories as that time. The Judicial Committee dismissed an application for leave to appeal from the Manitoba Queen's Bench: Riel v Her Majesty the Queen, [1885] UKPC 37.) | 1 | 0 | 0.0% | 1 | 100.0% |
| Total | 66 | 27 | 40.9% | 39 | 59.1% |

== See also ==
- List of Canadian appeals to the Judicial Committee of the Privy Council, 1867–1869
- List of Canadian appeals to the Judicial Committee of the Privy Council, 1870–1879
- List of Canadian appeals to the Judicial Committee of the Privy Council, 1890–1899
- List of Canadian appeals to the Judicial Committee of the Privy Council, 1900–1909
- List of Canadian appeals to the Judicial Committee of the Privy Council, 1910–1919
- List of Canadian appeals to the Judicial Committee of the Privy Council, 1920–1929
- List of Canadian appeals to the Judicial Committee of the Privy Council, 1930–1939
- List of Canadian appeals to the Judicial Committee of the Privy Council, 1940–1949
- List of Canadian appeals to the Judicial Committee of the Privy Council, 1950–1959

== Sources ==
- British and Irish Legal Information Institute: Privy Council Decisions
- 1880 Privy Council Decisions
- 1881 Privy Council Decisions
- 1882 Privy Council Decisions
- 1883 Privy Council Decisions
- 1884 Privy Council Decisions
- 1885 Privy Council Decisions
- 1886 Privy Council Decisions
- 1887 Privy Council Decisions
- 1888 Privy Council Decisions
- 1889 Privy Council Decisions
