= The Queen v Belleau =

Canadian constitutional law case – 1882

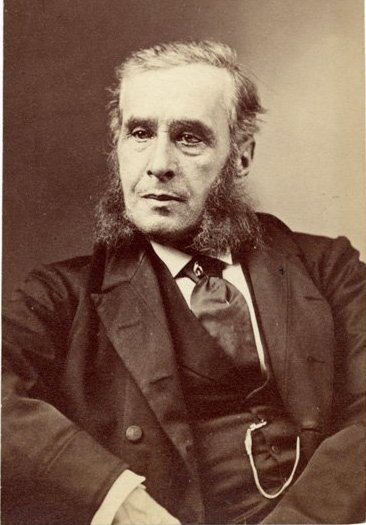
- Sir Narcisse-Fortunat Belleau, lead plaintiff in the case
- Court: Judicial Committee of the Privy Council
- Full case name: The Queen v Sir Narcisse Fortunat Belleau, Knight, and others
- Decided: June 20, 1882
- Citations: [1882] UKPC 31, 7 App Cas 473, 7 SCR 53, at 205

Case history
- Appealed from: Supreme Court of Canada

Court membership
- Judges sitting: Sir Barnes Peacock; Sir Montague Smith; Sir Robert P. Collier; Sir James Hannen; Sir Richard Couch

Case opinions
- Decision by: Sir James Hannen

Keywords
- Assumption of provincial debts by federal government at Confederation; need for legal authority for all public spending

The Queen v Belleau is a Canadian constitutional law case. It was decided in 1882 by the Judicial Committee of the Privy Council, at that time the highest court of appeal of the British Empire, including Canada. The point at issue was whether the federal government was required to pay either the principal or the interest, or both, on bonds issued by a public toll-road company, created by a pre-Confederation statute of the Province of Canada.

The lead plaintiff, Sir Narcisse-Fortunat Belleau, was a former joint premier of the Province of Canada and former Lieutenant Governor of Quebec, suing in his personal capacity as one of the bond-holders. They argued that the federal government was liable to pay amount owing under the bonds as a result of section 111 of the Constitution Act, 1867, which made the federal government liable for the pre-Confederation debts of the provinces.

The Judicial Committee held that under the terms of the pre-Confederation statute, the Province of Canada would not liable for the bonds, so neither was the federal government.

The case is included in a collection of significant constitutional decisions from the Judicial Committee, published by the federal Department of Justice.

== Facts of the case ==
In 1841, the Special Council of Lower Canada issued an ordinance to create a toll-road company, which was to build roads leading to Quebec City. The ordinance authorised the toll-road company to issue debentures to fund the construction of the roads, which were to be paid from the revenues received by the company. The company members were all appointed by the government and did not receive any personal profits from the roads.

In 1853, the Province of Canada, which was the successor to Lower Canada, passed a statute for the construction of more toll-roads by the company. The company was authorised to issue further debentures to fund the new roads, on the same terms as had been set out in the Lower Canada ordinance. One set of the new debentures totalled £30,000 and the second set totalled £40,000.

The amount of income produced by the later toll-roads was nowhere near enough to cover the principal for the debentures, or even to cover the interest costs. The first set of bonds came due in 1869, and the second set in 1874, but the company did not repay the principal. It stopped paying interest on the bonds in 1872. The federal Parliament did not take any steps to ensure the repayment of the amounts owing.

Section 111 of the Constitution Act, 1867 provides that the federal government is liable for the pre-Confederation debts of the provinces. A group of the bond-holders began a court case against the federal government, arguing that the federal government was the successor to the Province of Canada and was responsible to repay the principal and interest for both sets of bonds issued under the statute passed by the Province of Canada. The lead plaintiff was Sir Narcisse-Fortunat Belleau, a former joint premier of the Province of Canada and former Lieutenant Governor of Quebec, suing in his personal capacity as a bond-holder. The group as a whole claimed the amount of $70,072, with interest from July 1, 1872.

== Decisions of the Canadian courts ==
=== Exchequer Court of Canada ===
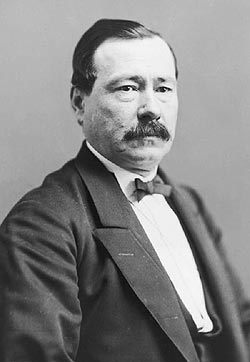
Justice Télesphore Fournier ruled in favour of the bondholders

The action was heard in the Exchequer Court of Canada, which had jurisdiction for monetary claims against the federal government. The trial judge was Justice Fournier, one of the judges of the Supreme Court of Canada, sitting ex officio as a judge of the Exchequer Court. The issue was whether the Province of Canada would have been liable for the debts of the toll-road company, and if so, whether the federal government was now responsible for the debts. Fournier concluded that the toll-road company was a public company, created to build public works. The members were all appointed by the government, and did not receive any personal profits from the roads. Since the company was fulfilling a public purpose, the Province of Canada would have been liable for the debts of the company.

Section 111 of the Constitution Act, 1867 provides that the federal government was responsible for all pre-Confederation debts of the provinces, which included the bonds in this case. Fournier concluded that the federal government was required to pay the principal on the two sets of bonds. However, he concluded that a specific provision of the 1853 statute did not allow the parties to recover interest from the government.

=== Supreme Court of Canada ===
The federal government appealed the decision to the Supreme Court of Canada, and the bond-holders cross-appealed on the ruling that they could not receive interest. A five judge panel of the Supreme Court, including Justice Fournier sitting on appeal from his own decision, dismissed the appeal from the federal government, and allowed the appeal from the bond-holders, granting them recovery of the interest.

All five judges agreed that the federal government became liable for all debts of the Province of Canada under section 111 of the Constitution Act, 1867. The issue was whether the statute made the Province of Canada liable for the debts of the turn-pike company.

Justices Henry and Taschereau concluded that the legislation did make the Province of Canada liable. They noted that the Province of Canada had actually repaid some of the money owing on the bonds issued under the 1841 ordinance. Since the 1853 statute said that the bonds were issued on the same terms as the 1841 ordinance, that meant that the Province of Canada had equally been liable to pay the bonds issued under the 1853 statute. They also went further than Fournier had done, and concluded that the province of Canada had also been liable to pay interest. Justice Fournier joined their conclusion, relying on his decision in the Exchequer Court.

Chief Justice Ritchie and Justice Gwynne dissented. They held that regardless of the payment by the Province of Canada, the 1853 statute clearly stated that the government was not liable for the debts of the turn-pike company. The fact that the government had in the past paid for some of the debts did not change the wording of the statute. The bond-holders therefore had no claim against the federal government.

== Judicial Committee decision ==
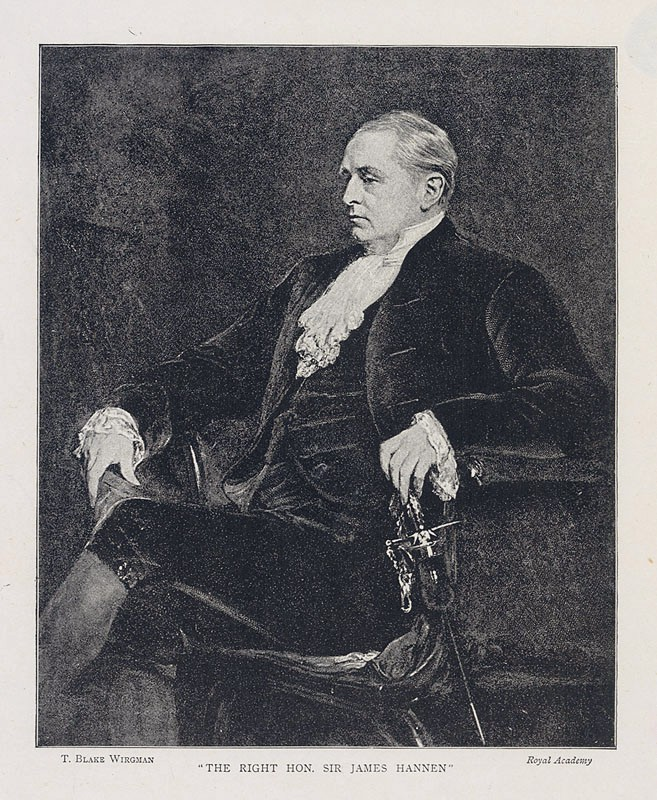
Sir James Hannen ruled in favour of the government of Canada

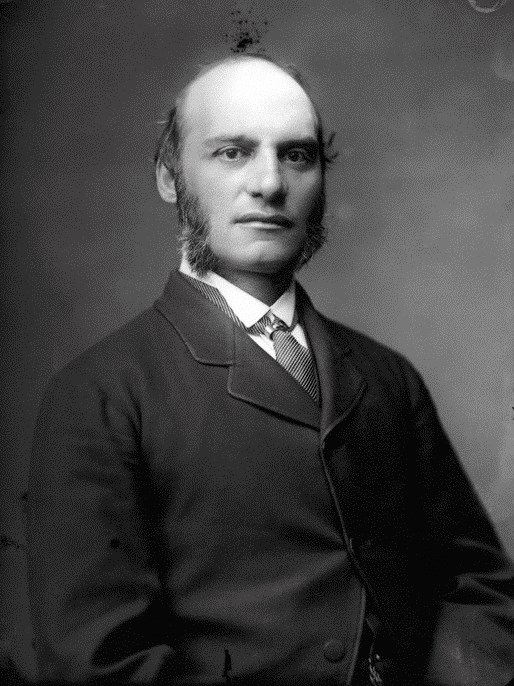
Solicitor-General Sir Farrer Herschell, lead counsel for the government of Canada

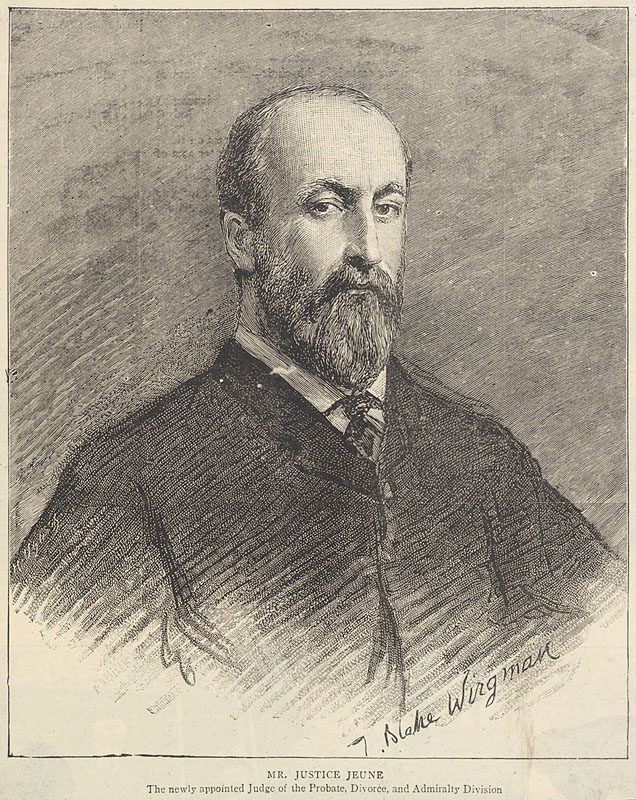
Francis Jeune, junior counsel for Canada

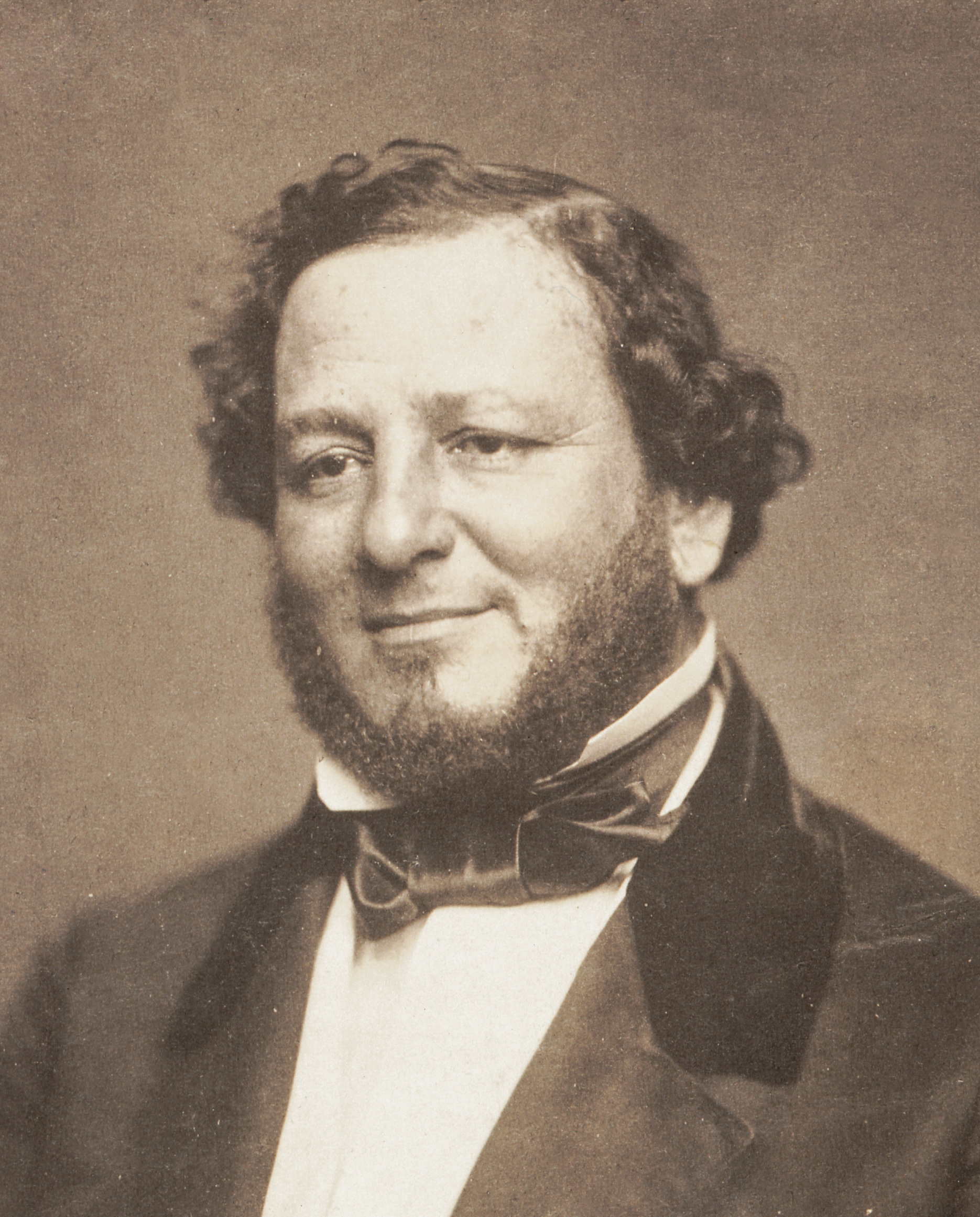
Judah P. Benjamin, QC, counsel for the bond-holders

The federal government then appealed to the Judicial Committee of the Privy Council in London, at that time the final appellate body for the British Empire, including Canada. The federal government was represented by the Solicitor-General of England, Sir Farrer Herschell, QC, juniored by Francis Jeune. The bond-holders were represented by George Latham, assisted by Judah Benjamin, QC (former Attorney General of the Confederate States of America). The Judicial Committee did not call on counsel for the appellant to give any reply.

Sir James Hannen gave the judgment on behalf of the Judicial Committee. The federal government had conceded that if the Province of Canada had been liable to pay the bond-holders, then the federal government was now liable under section 111 of the Constitution Act, 1867. The issue was whether the statute authorising the turn-pike company to issue bonds created a liability for the Province of Canada. Hannen held that it did not.

He commented that "The Government has no power to raise or apply revenue in any other way than is authorized by law." Reviewing the statutes, he found that the relevant wording provided that the principal was not to be "chargeable against the general revenue of the province," and that another provision barred the payment of interest. In light of these provisions, he concluded that the Province of Canada had not been liable for the payment of bonds and interest, regardless of the statutory basis for the toll-road company, carrying out a public purpose. Nothing in the statute indicated that the company was an agent of the Province, capable of binding the Province by contract.

As was the practice of the Judicial Committee at that time, Hannen gave the decision for the entire committee, with no reasons from any of the other judges.

== Significance of the decision ==
This case is included in the three volume set of significant decisions of the Judicial Committee on the construction and interpretation of the Constitution Act, 1867, prepared on the direction of the then Minister of Justice and Attorney General, Stuart Sinclair Garson, QC. Following the abolition of Canadian appeals to the Judicial Committee, Garson directed that the Department of Justice prepare the collection "for the convenience of the Bench and Bar in Canada". This case was included in the first volume of the set.

The case continues to be cited by the Canadian courts, most recently by the British Columbia Court of Appeal.
