= Colonial Building and Investment Association v Attorney General of Quebec =

Canadian constitutional law case – 1883

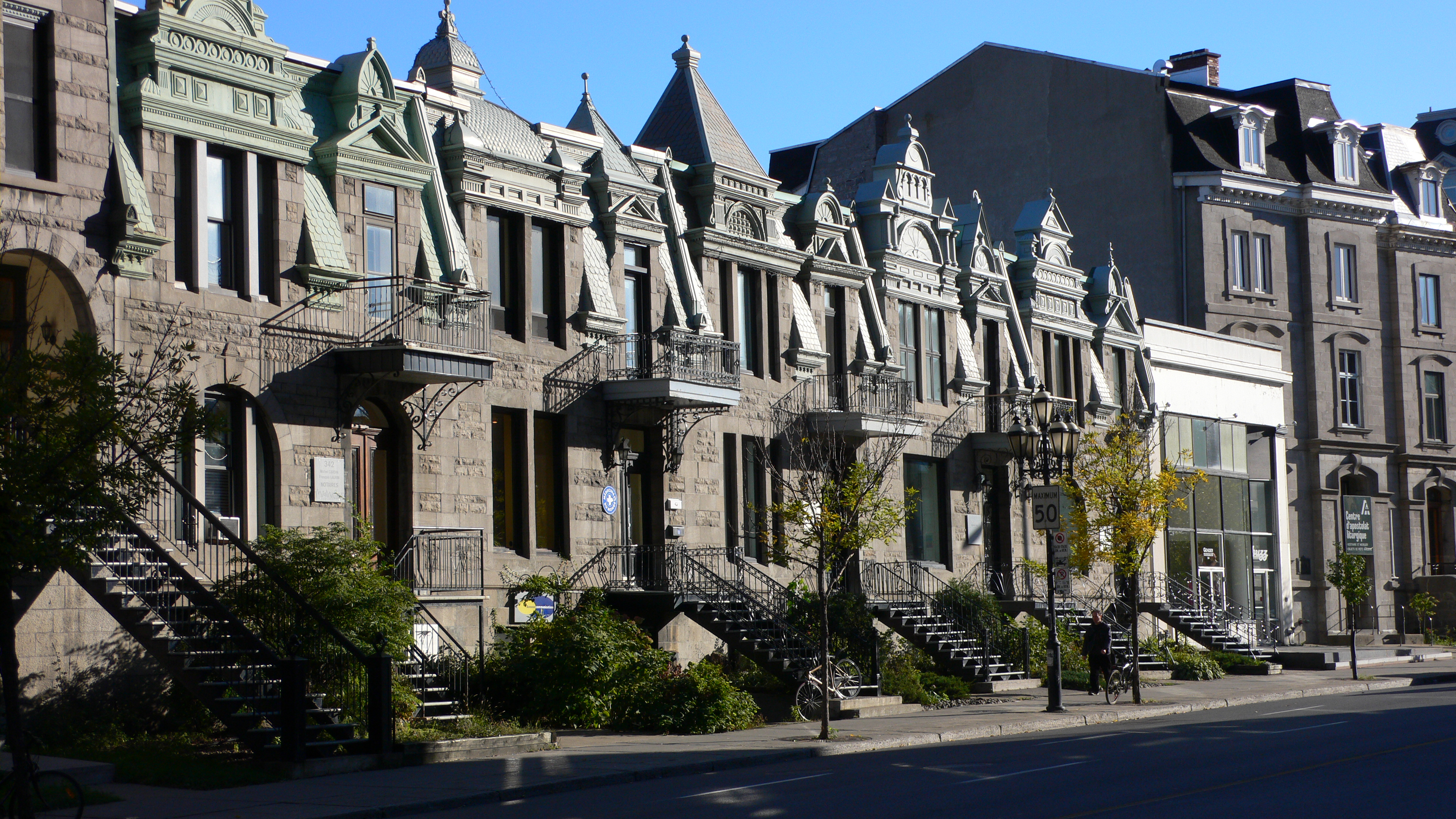
- Row houses on Sherbrooke Street, Montreal
- Court: Judicial Committee of the Privy Council
- Decided: December 1, 1883
- Citations: [1883] UKPC 54, 9 App. Cas. 157

Case history
- Appealed from: Quebec Court of Queen's Bench

Court membership
- Judges sitting: Lord FitzGerald; Sir Barnes Peacock; Sir Montague E. Smith; Sir Robert P. Collier; Sir Richard Couch; Sir Arthur Hobhouse

Case opinions
- Decision by: Sir Montague E. Smith

Keywords
- Division of powers; federal power to incorporate companies; provincial property and civil rights jurisdiction

Colonial Building and Investment Association v Attorney General of Quebec is a Canadian constitutional law decision of the Judicial Committee of the Privy Council in 1883, at that time the highest court of appeal in the British Empire, including Canada. It was decided under the British North America Act, 1867, now known as the Constitution Act, 1867.

The Colonial Building and Investment Association was a company incorporated by a federal statute. It did business in the province of Quebec, in the development of buildings and other construction projects. Acting on information from a shareholder, the Attorney General of Quebec applied to have the courts declare that the company was improperly incorporated, since its business was alleged to be entirely in areas of provincial jurisdiction.

The action was dismissed by the Superior Court of Quebec, but allowed by the Quebec Court of Queen's Bench. The company then appealed to the Judicial Committee, which allowed the appeal and held that a federally incorporated company could carry on business in subjects under provincial jurisdiction, provided it complied with the applicable provincial laws.

The case was one of the first cases dealing with the scope of the federal incorporation power and its interplay with provincial jurisdiction over property and civil rights in the province. It has been cited by several other decisions of the Judicial Committee and the Supreme Court of Canada.

The case is included in a collection of significant constitutional decisions from the Judicial Committee, published by the federal Department of Justice.

== Origins of the dispute ==
The Colonial Building and Investment Association was incorporated by a statute of the Parliament of Canada in 1874, on the petition of a group of investors in Montreal, Quebec. The objects of the company were to buy and sell land for the purposes of building "an improved class of villas, homesteads, cottages and other buildings and premises". The company could also maintain an investment fund, for individuals who wished to invest in the objects of the company. The company became a major developer in Montreal, known for its luxurious buildings, with avant-garde and innovative architectural features. The investment fund was also financially innovative, with the company becoming one of the first true trust companies in Quebec for investment and mortgage purposes.

A dispute arose between the company and one of its shareholders. The company sought to recover calls made upon the shareholder. The shareholder disputed his liability, arguing that the company was not legally incorporated and that it was insolvent. The shareholder filed a complaint with the Attorney General of Quebec, who became involved.

== Decisions of the Quebec courts ==
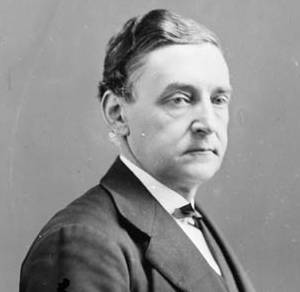
A.A. Dorion, Chief Justice of Quebec, who ruled in favour of the Attorney General of Quebec

The dispute went to trial in the Superior Court of Quebec. The shareholder argued that the company had been insolvent when the shares had been transferred to him. He also argued that the company had not been legally incorporated. This point was developed by the Attorney General, who argued that since the business of the company was all governed by provincial law, under provincial jurisdiction over property and civil rights, the federal company had not been properly incorporated. The Superior Court held in favour of the company, ruling that the company was solvent and properly incorporated to carry out its business.

The Attorney General appealed to the Quebec Court of Queen's Bench, which allowed the appeal by a 3–2 decision. The majority decision, given by Chief Justice Dorion, held that the company was properly incorporated by the federal government, but that it could not operate a business which was entirely governed by provincial law. The two dissenting judges agreed with the decision of the Superior Court.

== Decision of the Judicial Committee ==
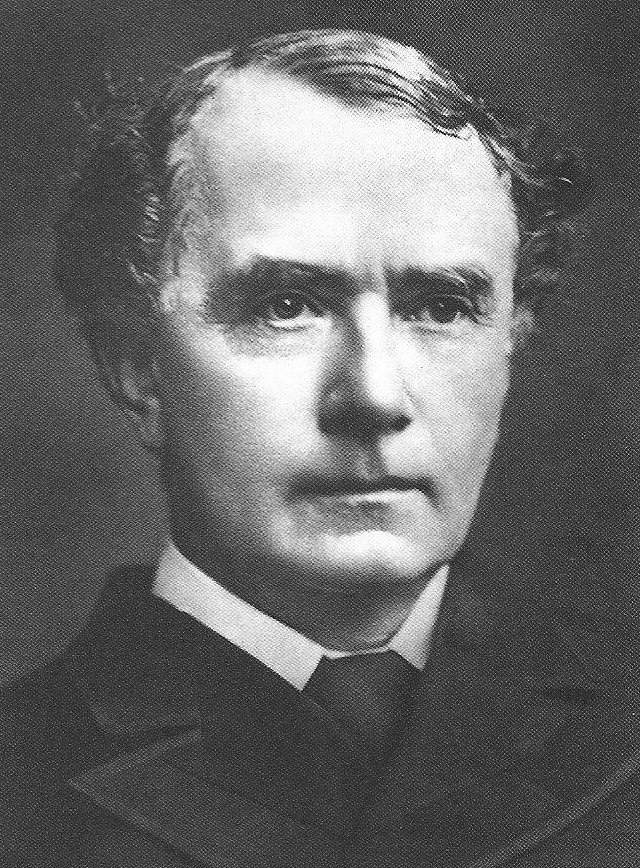
Henry Matthews, QC, lead counsel for Colonial Building

Colonial Building then appealed to the Judicial Committee of the Privy Council in Britain, at that time the final court of appeal in the British Empire, including Canada. (Note: At that time, an appellant could appeal directly from a provincial court of appeal to the Judicial Committee, bypassing the Supreme Court of Canada.) The company was represented by English barristers, Henry Matthews, QC, with Mr Fullarton as his junior. The Attorney General of Quebec was represented by two English barristers, as well as Désiré Girouard, QC, of the Quebec bar (later a judge on the Supreme Court of Canada).

Sir Montague Smith gave the decision for the Judicial Committee. He held that there was no doubt that the federal Parliament could incorporate the company, and could give it the necessary corporate capacity to carry out business throughout Canada. The fact that the company had limited its business activities to the province of Quebec did not affect the validity of the incorporation under federal law.

Smith also rejected the general claim by the Attorney General that the company could not be authorised to conduct business that was primarily governed by the laws of Quebec. He stated that the company would need to comply with provincial law, such as a restriction on landholding by a corporation, but no specific allegation of breach of provincial laws had been made at trial. It would not be appropriate for the Judicial Committee to consider a new issue of that sort on appeal.

Smith therefore recommended the appeal be allowed, in favour of Colonial Building. As was the practice of the Judicial Committee at that time, Smith gave the decision for the entire committee, with no reasons from any of the other judges.

== Significance of the decision ==
Colonial Building was cited by both the Judicial Committee and the Supreme Court of Canada in subsequent cases about the constitutional issues raised by the incorporation of companies, particularly in John Deere Plow Company Ltd. v Wharton, In re Companies, and Bonanza Creek Gold Mining Co. v. The King. It has been cited most recently by the Supreme Court in Canadian Pioneer Management Ltd. v. Labour Relations Board of Saskatchewan.

This case is included in the three volume set of significant decisions of the Judicial Committee on the construction and interpretation of the British North America Act, 1867 (now the Constitution Act, 1867), prepared on the direction of the then Minister of Justice and Attorney General, Stuart Sinclair Garson, QC. He directed that the Department of Justice prepare the collection "for the convenience of the Bench and Bar in Canada", following the abolition of Canadian appeals to the Judicial Committee. This case was included in the first volume of the set. (Note: The volume reproduces each case with its original page numbering from the Appeal Cases report, which are used when the case is cited here.)
