= Dobie v Temporalities Board =

Canadian constitutional law case – 1881

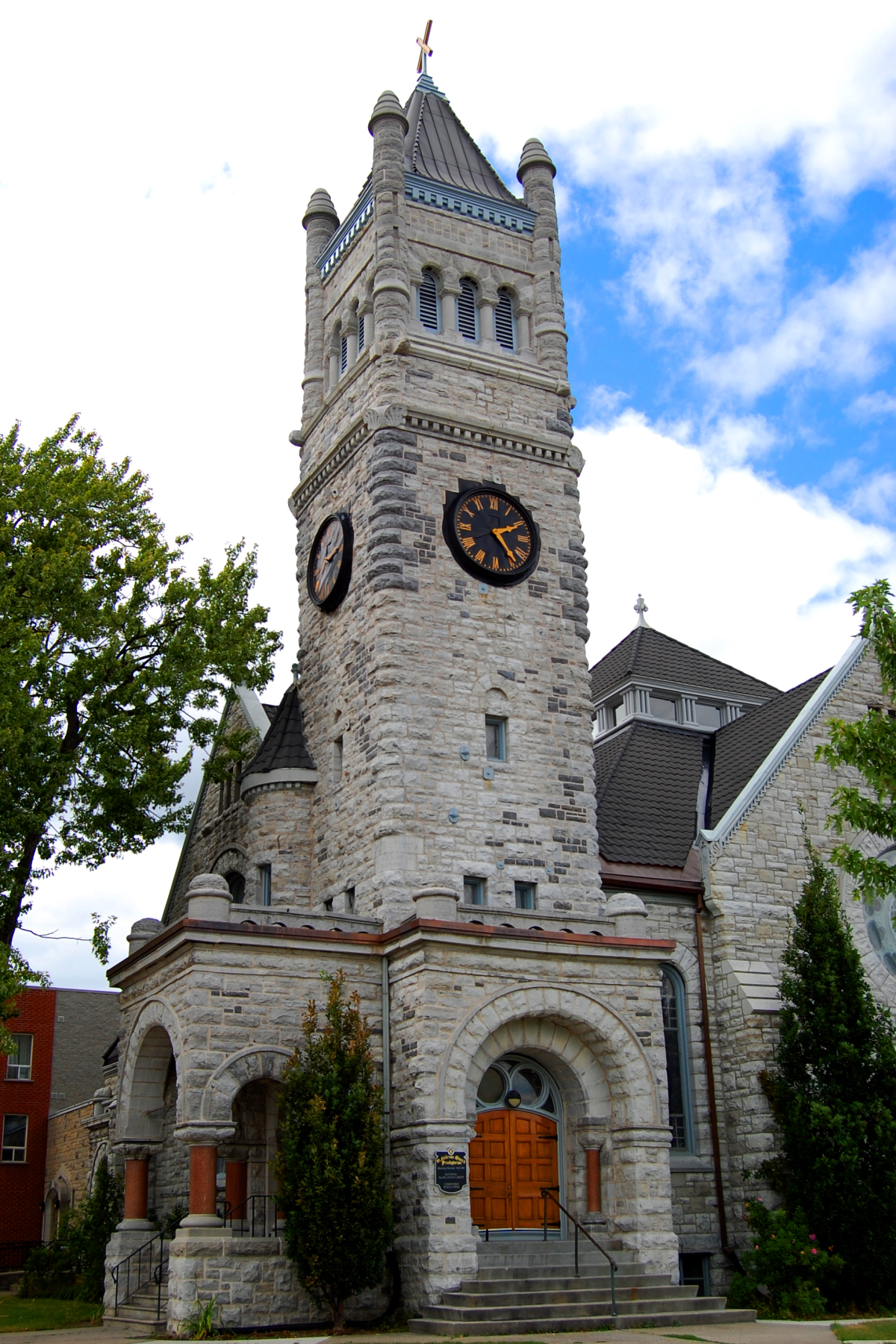
- St Andrew's Church, Kingston, Ontario, the centre of Presbyterianism in Upper Canada
- Court: Judicial Committee of the Privy Council
- Full case name: Rev. Robert Dobie v Board for the Management of the Temporalities Fund of the Presbyterian Church of Canada in Connection with the Church of Scotland, and Others
- Decided: January 21, 1882
- Citations: [1882] UKPC 4, (1882) 7 App.Cas. 136

Case history
- Prior actions: Dobie v Temporalities Board (1880), 3 L.N. 244 (Que. Q.B.)
- Appealed from: Quebec Court of Queen's Bench (Appeal Side)

Court membership
- Judges sitting: Lord Blackburn; Lord Watson; Sir Barnes Peacock; Sir Montague Smith; Sir Robert P. Collier; Sir Richard Couch; Sir Arthur Hobhouse

Case opinions
- Decision by: Lord Watson

Keywords
- Constitutional law, pre-Confederation incorporations

Dobie v Temporalities Board is a Canadian constitutional law case. It was decided in 1881 by the Judicial Committee of the Privy Council, at that time the highest court in the British Empire, including Canada. The case concerned the power of the provinces and the federal Parliament to deal with legal rights created by statutes enacted prior to Confederation in 1867.

The case arose from the merger of four different Presbyterian churches in Canada in 1875 into one church, the Presbyterian Church of Canada. One of the predecessor churches, the "Presbyterian Church of Canada in connection with the Church of Scotland", held substantial investments for the payment of stipends and annuities for the clergy of that church. The investments were controlled by the Temporalities Board of that church, which was based in Montreal. Following the merger of the four churches, a Quebec statute transferred control of the Temporalities Board to the new Presbyterian Church of Canada. A group of dissentient clergy, led by Rev. Dobie, contested the validity of the union and the constitutional validity of the provincial statute which transferred the Temporalities Board to the new church.

The Judicial Committee concluded that only the federal Parliament had jurisdiction to amend the terms of the statute governing the Temporalities Board. The pre-Confederation legislation had applied throughout the Province of Canada, which had been split into the new provinces of Ontario and Quebec. Since the former statute applied in both provinces, only the federal Parliament could alter it after Confederation.

The case is included in a collection of significant constitutional decisions from the Judicial Committee, published by the federal Department of Justice.

== Dispute over Presbyterian church funds ==
The case started over the union of four different Presbyterian churches in Canada into one church, the Presbyterian Church of Canada. One of the four predecessor churches, the "Presbyterian Church of Canada in connection with the Church of Scotland", had investments which were held by the Temporalities Board of that church. The Temporalities Board had been created by an act of the Parliament of the Province of Canada in 1858. The government of the Province of Canada provided funds for the Temporalities Board as part of the distribution of the clergy reserves, which had been set aside in 1791 for the support of Protestant churches in Lower Canada and Upper Canada. When the Temporalities Board was created in 1858, its share of the reserves was £127,448, 5s.

The Temporalities Board was to pay stipends and life annuities to the clergy of the "Presbyterian Church of Canada in connection with the Church of Scotland". Its authority to manage the fund and pay the stipends and annuities was set out in the 1858 statute of the Province of Canada. The legislation expressly stated that all members of the Board were to be members of the "Presbyterian Church of Canada in connection with the Church of Scotland." The Board was based in Montreal.

Upon Confederation in 1867, the Province of Canada was split into two new provinces, Ontario and Quebec, each with its own legislature, and the federal Parliament of Canada was created. The British North America Act, 1867 (now the Constitution Act, 1867) set out the powers of the provincial legislatures and the federal Parliament.

Prior to Confederation, there were four different Presbyterian Churches in British North America, two in the Province of Canada and two in the Maritime Provinces. Following Confederation, the four churches began to consider union. In 1874, the Quebec Legislature passed two statutes which provided for the possibility of union, including provisions for the allocation of the property of the Temporalities Board to the proposed united church. In 1875, the four churches met together in a joint conference, and the representatives of all four voted in favour of union. A small group of ministers from the former Presbyterian Church of Canada in connection with the Church of Scotland, led by Rev. Dobie, dissented from the union.

After the union, the new Presbyterian Church of Canada claimed the property of the Temporalities Board, as authorised by the Quebec statute. Dobie contested the ability of the new church to do so, arguing that the union could not have the effect of changing the ownership of the investments under the 1858 statute of the Province of Canada. He argued that he and the other dissenting ministers continued to form the "Presbyterian Church of Canada in connection with the Church of Scotland", and had control over the Temporalities Board.

== Decisions of the Quebec courts ==
Dobie, who lived in Ontario, challenged the merger, arguing that he was entitled to be paid the stipend and annuity under the terms of the Province of Canada statute. He applied to the Superior Court of Quebec for an injunction prohibiting the Temporalities Board from dealing with the funds, on the basis that Quebec could not alter the terms of the legislation governing the Temporalities Board, created by the former Province of Canada. His counsel on the file was John Abbott, QC, a highly respected lawyer who later became prime minister of Canada. Dobie was unsuccessful. Justice Jetté of the Superior Court dismissed Dobie's petition, holding that the rights to the fund were a matter of property and civil rights within the province of Quebec, and therefore within provincial jurisdiction under s. 92(13) of the Constitution Act, 1867. Jetté held that Dobie's residence in Ontario did not prevent Quebec from changing the terms of the fund.

The Quebec Court of Queen's Bench (Appeal Side), dismissed his appeal from that decision, in a split decision. Chief Justice Dorion and Justice Monk held that the Quebec statute was within the constitutional authority of the province, and therefore the transfer of the Board to the new Presbyterian Church was valid. Two other judges, Justice Ramsay and Justice Tessier, took the opposite position, and held that the statute was ultra vires the province's legislative authority, and therefore unconstitutional, so the Board did not transfer to the new church. The fifth judge, Justice M'Cord, agreed that the statute was unconstitutional, but he took the position that the "Presbyterian Church of Canada in connection with the Church of Scotland" had the corporate authority to admit the other three churches into union with it. He therefore agreed with Chief Justice Dorion and Justice Monk that the transfer of the Board was valid, once the union had occurred. By a 3–2 majority, the decision of the Superior Court was affirmed.

== Decision of the Judicial Committee ==
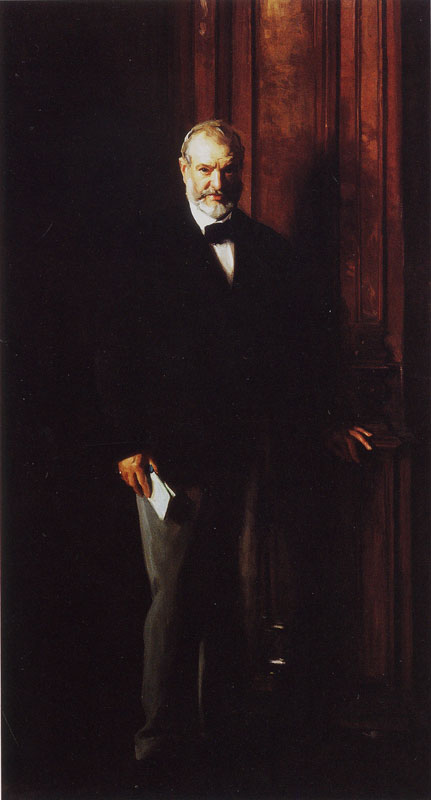
Lord Watson, who gave the decision of the Judicial Committee

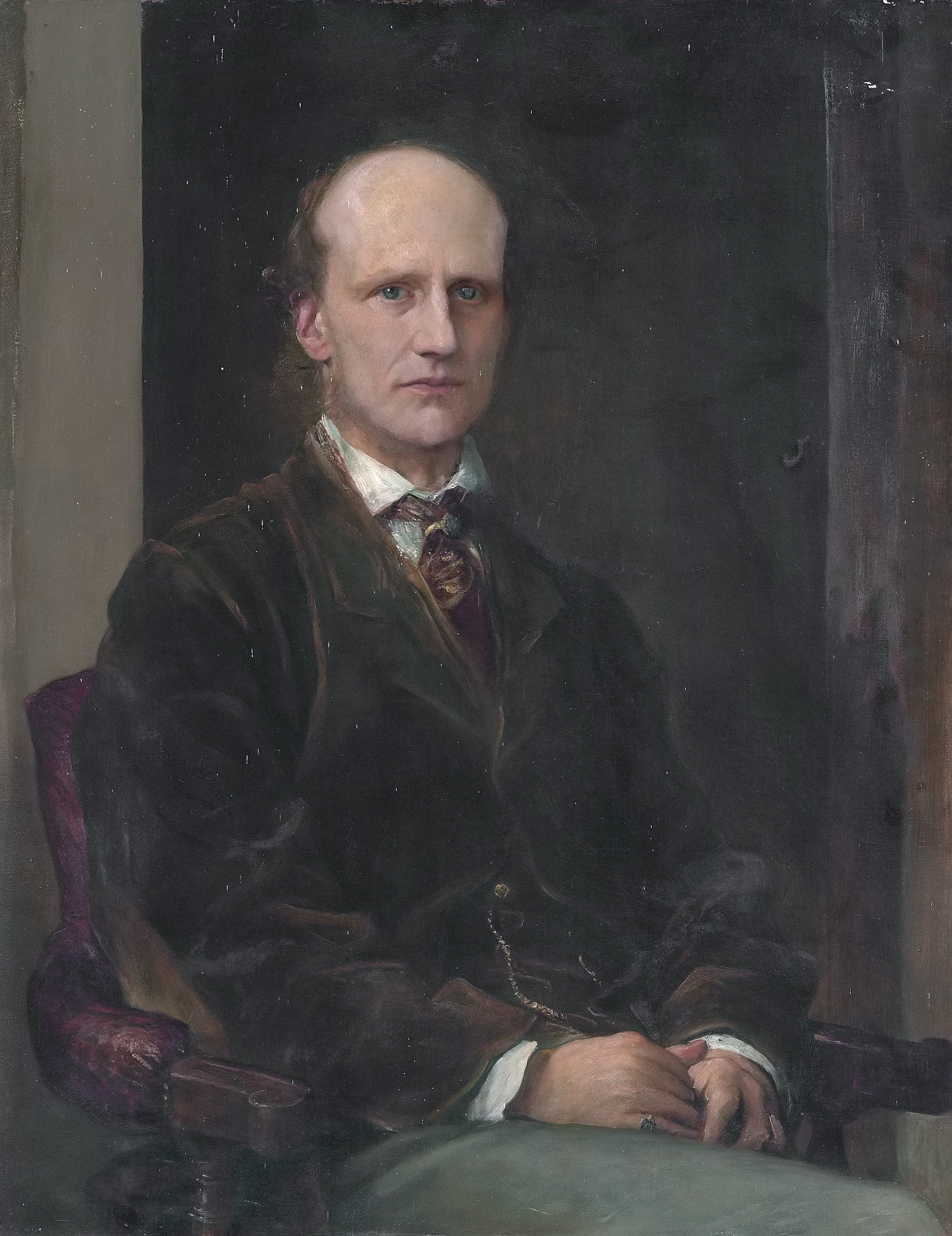
Horace Davey, QC, counsel for Dobie

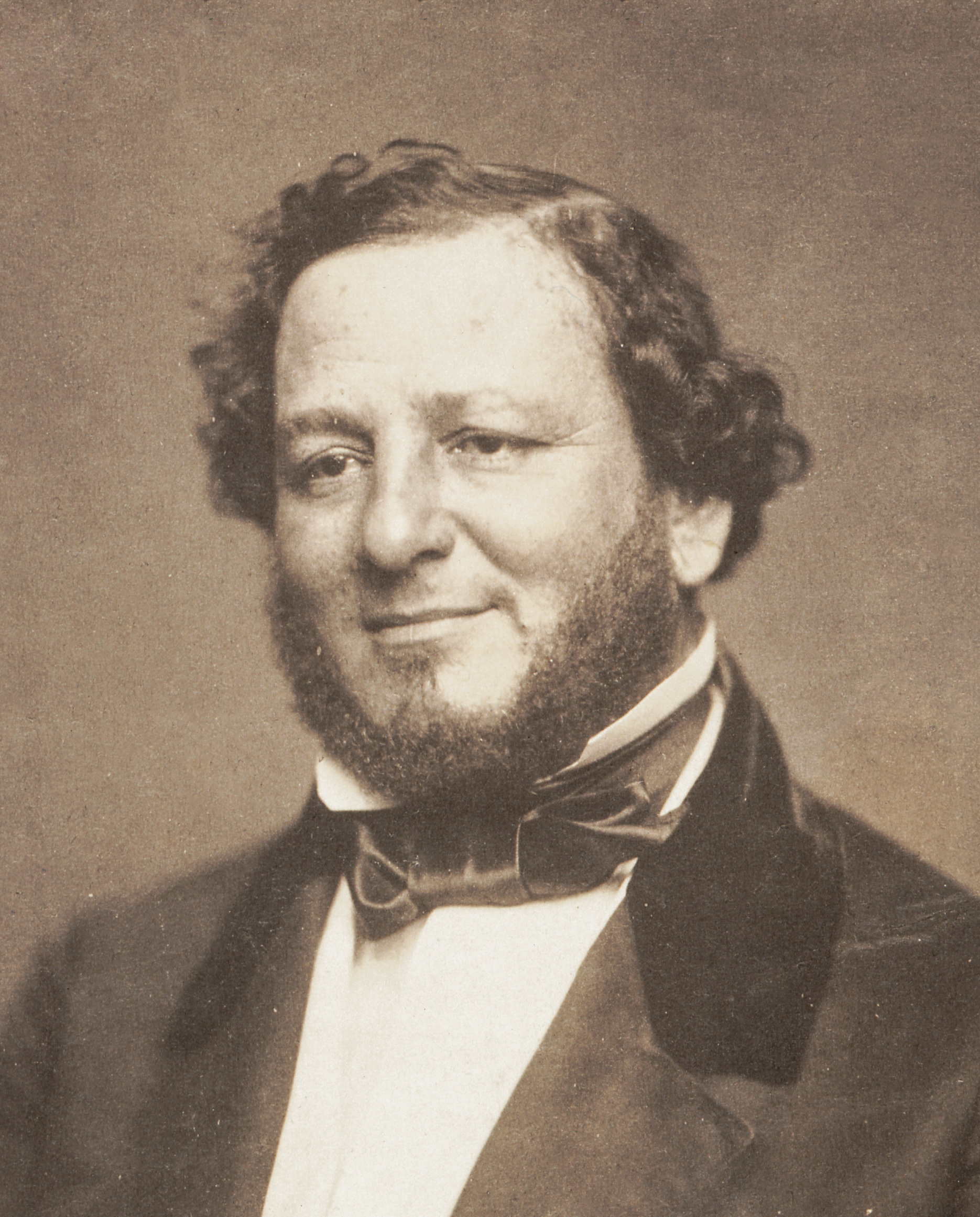
Judah P. Benjamin, QC, counsel for the Temporalities Board

Dobie then appealed to the Judicial Committee of the Privy Council in Britain, at that time the final court of appeal in the British Empire, including Canada. He was represented by one of the leading London barristers, Horace Davey, QC, Mr McMaster from Canada, and Mr Fullarton of London. The Temporalities Board was represented by Judah P. Benjamin, QC (former Attorney General of the Confederate States of America), J.L. Morris of Montreal, and F.H. Jeune of London.

Lord Watson gave the decision of the Judicial Committee, allowing Dobie's appeal. He referred to section 129 of the Constitution Act, 1867, which provides that after that Act came into force in 1867, a pre-Confederation law could be modified by either the federal Parliament or the provincial Legislatures, depending on whether the pre-Confederation law now fell within federal jurisdiction under section 91 of the Constitution Act, 1867, or within provincial jurisdiction under section 92 of the Act.

He concluded that the 1858 Act of the Province of Canada which created the Temporalities Board and assigned rights to the funds could not be considered to now come within provincial jurisdiction, because the Board existed in both Quebec and Ontario, and the rights to the funds also applied in both provinces. The fact that the Board had its office in Quebec and the funds were invested in Quebec did not change that position. Since the pre-Confederation Act applied in both provinces and gave rights in both provinces, only the federal Parliament could alter it.

Lord Watson recommended that the appeal be allowed, the Quebec statute be declared ultra vires, and the injunction sought by Dobie to be granted. He directed that Dobie was entitled to his costs of the appeal, to be paid personally by the members of the Board appointed under the Quebec statute, not out of the funds of the Temporalities Board.

As was the practice of the Judicial Committee at that time, Watson gave the decision for the entire committee, with no reasons from any of the other judges.

== Response of the federal Parliament ==
The Judicial Committee issued its decision on January 21, 1882, affirming that only the Parliament of Canada could amend the pre-Confederation statute. By May 17, 1882, Parliament had enacted a statute to deal with the issue. The federal statute provided that all those ministers and congregations of the "Presbyterian Church of Canada in connection with the Church of Scotland" were to continue to receive the annuities, stipends and grants under the terms of the pre-Confederation act. The federal act also confirmed that the members of the Board were to be drawn only from those who received the stipends and annuities. However, as time passed and the number of those receiving stipends and annuities decreased, the Board would be transferred to the control of the new Presbyterian Church of Canada.

== Significance of the decision ==
The Dobie case continues to be cited by the Canadian courts, most recently in two cases by the Alberta Court of Appeal. It is cited in one of the leading constitutional law texts, as well as in the Canadian Encyclopedic Digest, one of the standard legal research guides.

This case is included in the three volume set of significant decisions of the Judicial Committee on the construction and interpretation of the Constitution Act, 1867, prepared on the direction of the then Minister of Justice and Attorney General, Stuart Sinclair Garson, QC. Following the abolition of Canadian appeals to the Judicial Committee, Garson directed that the Department of Justice prepare the collection "for the convenience of the Bench and Bar in Canada". This case was included in the first volume of the set.
