= Walter Peacock =

British politician (1871–1956)

Sir Walter Peacock KCVO (24 May 1871 – 24 February 1956) was a British Liberal Party politician and barrister who worked for the future King Edward VIII of the United Kingdom during the latter's tenure as Prince of Wales.

== Background ==
He was the son of the Rt Hon. Sir Barnes Peacock. He was educated at Eton and Trinity College, Cambridge. He married, in 1927, Irene Cynthia Le Mesurier (biographer of Queen Elizabeth II, Bernard Montgomery, 1st Viscount Montgomery of Alamein, Prince Charles and Princess Anne, and author of An Authoritative Account, The Adventure of Cooking, Cooking is Exciting and Beating Austerity in the Kitchen).

== Career ==
Peacock was called to the bar at the Inner Temple, 1894. He was Resident Councillor and Keeper of the Records of the Duchy of Cornwall and a Member of the Prince of Wales' Council from 1908 to 1930. He was Treasurer to the Prince of Wales from 1910 to 1915. He was a Member of the Royal Fine Art Commission from 1930 to 1934.

== Political career ==
He was Liberal candidate for the Camborne Division of Cornwall at the 1935 United Kingdom general election. This was a traditionally Liberal seat that the party had lost to the Conservatives in 1931 and had hopes of regaining. However, Peacock was unsuccessful;

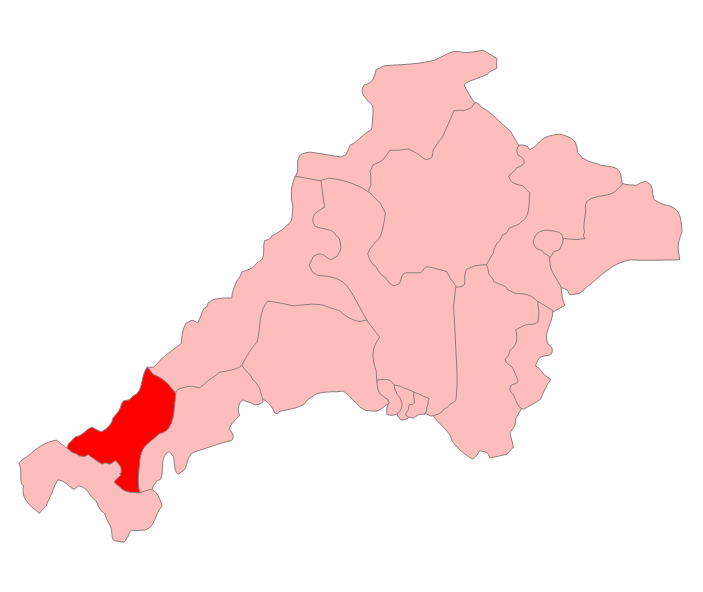
The Camborne constituency shown within Cornwall and Devon, 1918–1945.

General Election 1935 Electorate 44,542
Party	Candidate	Votes	%	±%
Conservative	Peter Garnett Agnew	14,826	48.3	+4.9
Liberal	Sir Walter Peacock	7,921	25.8	−6.3
Labour	Harold R G Greaves	7,375	24.0	n/a
Ind. Labour Party	Kate Florence Spurrell	592	1.9	−22.6
Majority		6,905	22.5	−11.2
Turnout			66.9	
Conservative hold		Swing		

He did not stand for parliament again, however, in 1936 he was elected to serve on the Liberal Party Council.

== Awards ==
He was made a member of the Royal Victorian Order (MVO) in the 1911 Coronation Honours, promoted to Commander of the Order (CVO) in the 1916 Birthday Honours, and in the 1924 Birthday Honours a Knight Commander of the Order (KCVO). He was an Honorary member of the Royal Institute of British Architects.
