= Attorney General for Quebec v Reed =

Canadian constitutional law case – 1884

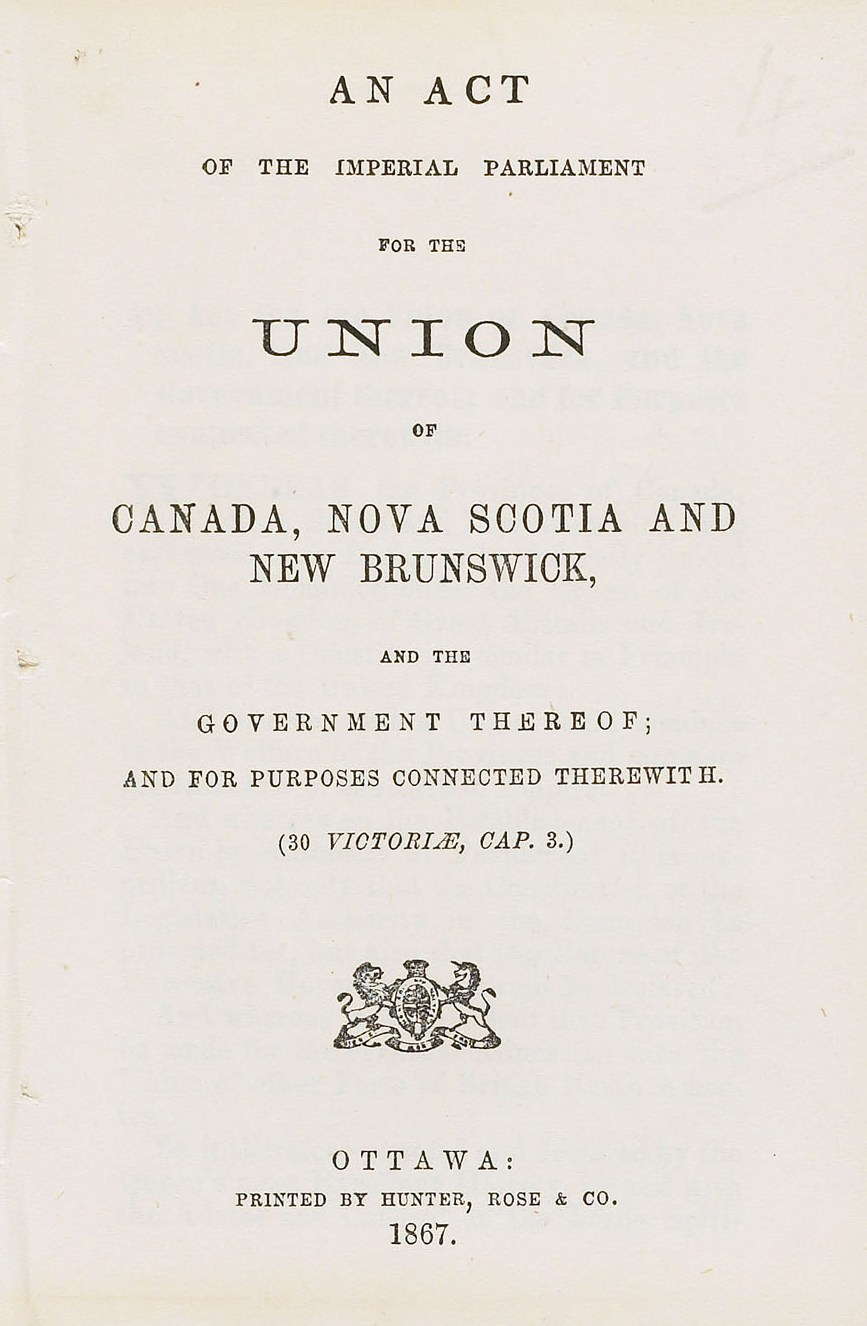
- Cover page of the British North America Act, 1867
- Court: Judicial Committee of the Privy Council
- Full case name: Attorney General for Quebec v Walter Reed
- Decided: November 26, 1884
- Citation: (1884) 10 AC 141, [1884] UKPC 44

Case history
- Prior action: Reed v. Mousseau (1883), 8 SCR 408, 1883 CanLII 26 (SCC)
- Appealed from: Supreme Court of Canada

Court membership
- Judges sitting: The Earl of Selborne, Lord Chancellor; Lord FitzGerald; Sir Montague E. Smith; Sir Robert P. Collier

Case opinions
- Decision by: The Lord Chancellor

Keywords
- Constitutional law, direct taxation

Attorney General for Quebec v Reed is a Canadian constitutional law decision of the Judicial Committee of the Privy Council in 1884, at that time the highest court of appeal in the British Empire, including Canada.

The case arose from a stamp duty that was required under Quebec law to be paid upon filing a document with the courts. The duty was paid by attaching a provincial revenue stamp to the document. The issue was whether the stamp duty was within the constitutional authority of the provincial legislature. The Supreme Court of Canada ruled that the duty was unconstitutional. The Attorney General for Quebec appealed that decision to the Judicial Committee, which dismissed the appeal, agreeing with the Supreme Court.

The Judicial Committee held that the stamp duty was not a direct tax under s. 92(2) of the Constitution Act, 1867, nor was it justified under the provincial jurisdiction over the administration of justice under s. 92(14) of the act. The Judicial Committee also rejected an argument that the stamp duty could be upheld under a pre-Confederation statute.

The case has been cited several times in subsequent cases, by both the Judicial Committee and the Supreme Court, on the constitutional meaning of a direct tax. It is also included in a collection of significant constitutional decisions from the Judicial Committee, published by the federal Department of Justice.

== Facts ==
In 1880, the Legislature of Quebec enacted The Stamps Regulation Act to consolidate the provincial law relating to the use of revenue stamps to collect fees from the public. Section 9 of the act provided that a duty of 10 cents was imposed on "each promissory note, receipt, bill of particulars and exhibit whatsoever produced and filed before the superior court". The duty was to be paid by means of stamps purchased from the government and affixed to the document.

== Judgments of the Canadian courts ==
Section 92 of the Constitution Act, 1867 sets out the powers of the provincial legislatures. By s. 92(2), the provincial taxation powers are limited to direct taxation. The plaintiff, Walter Reed, objected to paying the duty, and applied to have the prothonotaries of the Superior Court held in contempt for refusing to accept an exhibit he attempted to file without the stamp.

In response to Reed's application, the Attorney General for Quebec intervened to defend the statute. The Superior Court accepted Reed's arguments and found the statute unconstitutional. It held that the prothonotaries were potentially subject to a contempt order, carrying six months imprisonment, if they refused to accept the document. The Attorney General then appealed to the Quebec Court of Queen's Bench (Appeal Side), which held the statute was constitutional. The court allowed the appeal on a 3–2 split, Chief Justice Dorion dissenting.

The Supreme Court of Canada allowed the appeal, holding the statute was an indirect tax and therefore unconstitutional. The court divided 4–2 on the issue, with Chief Justice Ritchie, and Justices Fournier, Henry and Gwynne agreeing with the Superior Court and Dorion's dissent. Justices Strong and Taschereau dissented, and would have upheld the stamp fee based on a pre-Confederation statute.

== Decision of the Judicial Committee ==
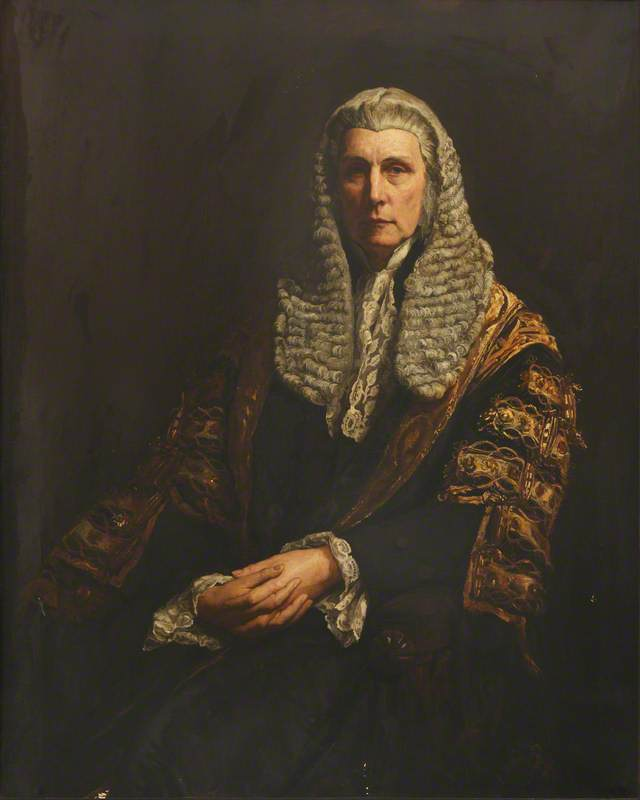
The Lord Chancellor, who gave the decision of the Judicial Committee

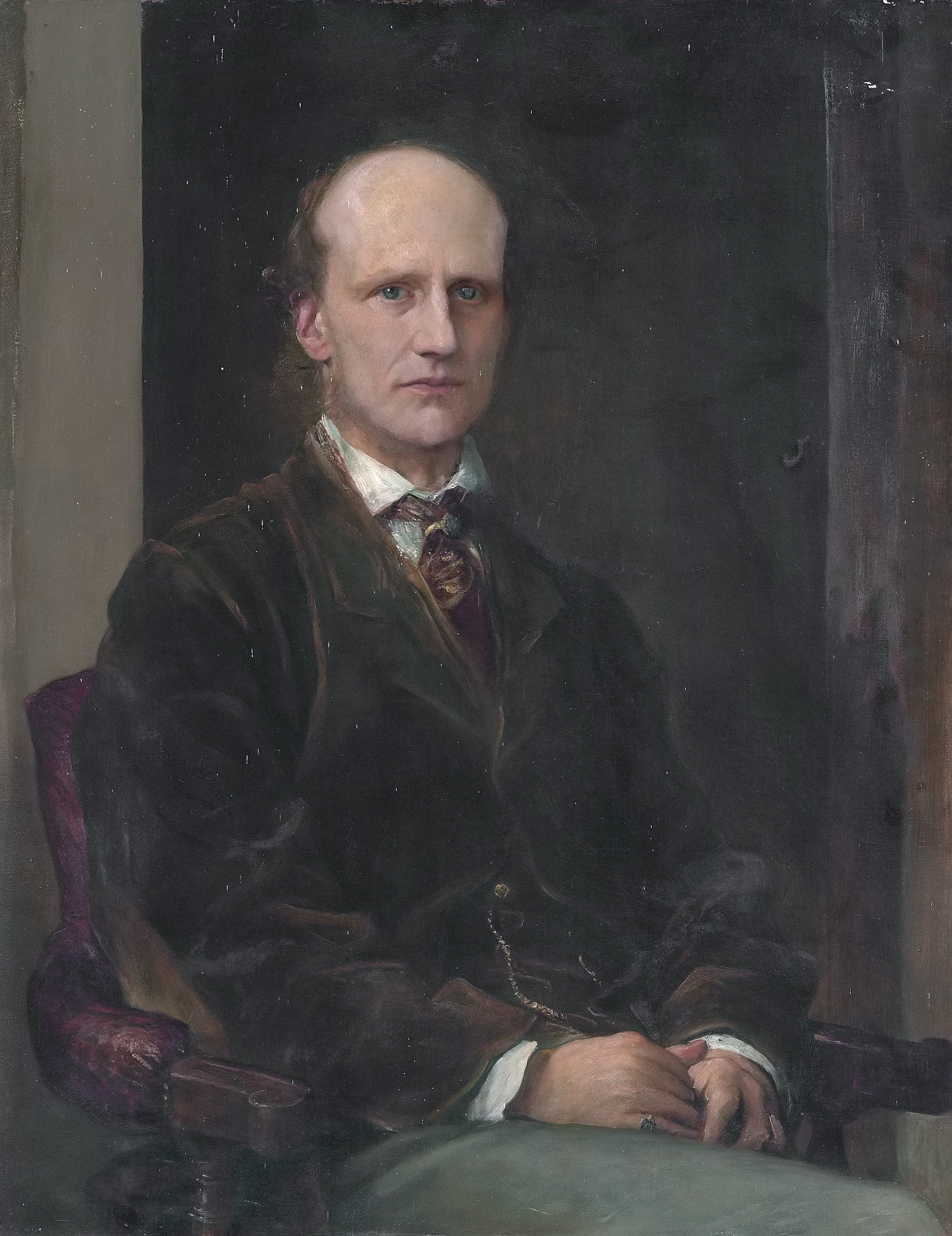
Horace Davey, QC, counsel for the Attorney General of Quebec

The Attorney General of Quebec then appealed to the Judicial Committee of the Privy Council in Britain, at that time the final court of appeal in the British Empire, including Canada. The Attorney General was represented by one of the leading London barristers, Horace Davey, QC, and Mr Glokensky, QC, a lawyer from Canada. The plaintiff, Reed, did not appear.

The Lord Chancellor, the Earl of Selborne, gave the decision of the committee. On the first point, he held that the stamp duty was not a direct tax. Relying on definitions of direct and indirect taxation from the economist John Stuart Mill, he concluded that a direct tax had to be demanded of the very person who would pay it, while an indirect tax could reasonably be expected to be passed on to some other person than the one who paid it. Since the provisions for court costs meant that the stamp duty would ultimately be paid by the unsuccessful party in the litigation, not necessarily the party who paid the duty initially, it was an indirect tax and not within provincial taxing power under section 92(2).

The second point was whether the stamp duty could be upheld under provincial jurisdiction over the administration of justice. Selborne concluded that it could not be, because the stamp duty was not dedicated to the upkeep of the court system. It went into the general revenues of the province. Since the stamp duty was not tied to the upkeep of the court system, it was not part of the administration of justice under section 92(14).

Finally, Selborne rejected the argument based on a pre-Confederation statute, designed to raise revenue for particular court buildings in the province. He held that on the terms of the statute, it was not linked to the court system generally, and could not be the basis for the stamp duty.

Selborne therefore dismissed the Attorney General's appeal. As was the practice of the Judicial Committee at that time, Selborne gave the decision for the entire committee, with no reasons from any of the other judges.

== Significance of the decision ==
Attorney General of Quebec v Reed has been cited many times since it was decided, by both the Judicial Committee and the Supreme Court. In particular, the Judicial Committee cited it in one of the major cases on the meaning of "direct taxation" in 1887: Bank of Toronto v Lambe. The Supreme Court also continues to cite it, most recently in 1994 in Reference re Quebec Sales Tax.

This case is included in the three volume set of significant decisions of the Judicial Committee on the construction and interpretation of the British North America Act, 1867 (now the Constitution Act, 1867), prepared on the direction of the then Minister of Justice and Attorney General, Stuart Garson, QC. He directed that the Department of Justice prepare the collection "for the convenience of the Bench and Bar in Canada", following the abolition of Canadian appeals to the Judicial Committee. This case was included in the first volume of the set. (Note: The volume reproduces each case with its original page numbering from the Appeal Cases report, which are used when the case is cited here.)
