= Barnes Peacock =

British Indian judge

The Right Honourable Sir Barnes Peacock

1st Chief Justice of Calcutta High Court
- In office 1 July 1862 - 1870
- Preceded by: Position Established
- Succeeded by: Sir Richard Couch
- Appointed by: Queen Victoria

Chief Justice of the Supreme Court of Judicature at Fort William
- In office 1859 - 1862
- Appointed by: Queen Victoria
- Preceded by: Sir James Colvile
- Succeeded by: Position Abolished

Personal details
- Born: 7 January 1805 St Giles, London, England
- Died: 3 December 1890 (aged 85) South Kensington, London, England
- Resting place: Highgate Cemetery, London
- Children: 12, including Walter Peacock
- Occupation: Lawyer, Judge

Sir Barnes Peacock (7 January 1805 – 3 December 1890) was an English barrister and judge who served as the first chief justice of the Calcutta High Court in India and the final chief justice of the Supreme Court of Judicature at Fort William. Alongside Lord Macaulay, he is credited with authoring the Indian Penal Code. He is also noted for pointing out the flaw that invalidated Daniel O’Connell’s 1843 sentence.

== Background and early career ==
Barnes Peacock was born on 7 January 1805 in St Giles to Lewis Peacock and Elizabeth Peacock. His father was a solicitor and held the office of Messenger to the Great Seal. His grandfather, also called Lewis Peacock, had served as Mayor of Lowestoft.

Peacock was admitted to the Inner Temple in 1828, and practised for several years as a special pleader until he was called to the bar in 1836, joining the Home Circuit. His speciality, owing to his training and physique, was in arguing refined points rather than imposing his will upon common juries.

In 1843, famed Irish political campaigner Daniel O'Connell held a major political rally in Clontarf, Ireland, in favour of Irish independence. At this rally, which the government had prohibited in order to prevent civil unrest, O'Connell was arrested and so he subsequently disbanded the rally. O'Connell was sentenced to a year’s imprisonment as well as fined £2,000. In August 1844, he tried to appeal the case by way of writ of error to the House of Lords. Peacock, as well as other more senior counsel, were required to defend him in this appeal. Peacock, despite his junior standing, pointed out a flaw that, although technical, could not be refuted by those representing the case against O'Connell. This led the House to revert the original decision and O'Connell was released from custody.

Following this success, from which Peacock’s subsequent fame and distinction is thought to have arisen, he practised on the back benches until he took silk on 28 February 1850. He was elected a bencher of the Inner Temple that same year.

Peacock had a number of pupils, including George Jessel, George Denman, and George Cornewall Lewis.

== British India ==
In 1852, Peacock travelled to Calcutta, which was at that point the capital of British India, upon being appointed Legal Member of the Supreme Council to the Governor-General of India. In this capacity he served under the Marquess of Dalhousie until 1856 and from then under Lord Canning. Under Lord Dalhousie, Peacock supported the annexation of Oudh in 1856 through the Doctrine of lapse. He similarly supported Canning throughout the Indian Mutiny. The Legislative Council was established soon after his arrival, although he was so frequent a speaker that legislation that made councillors deliver their speeches sitting was said to have been devised with the sole purpose of restraining him. As a legal member of the Council of India, Peacock was mostly concerned with codification of Common Law in India and the establishment of the Indian Penal Code. He left this role in April 1859.

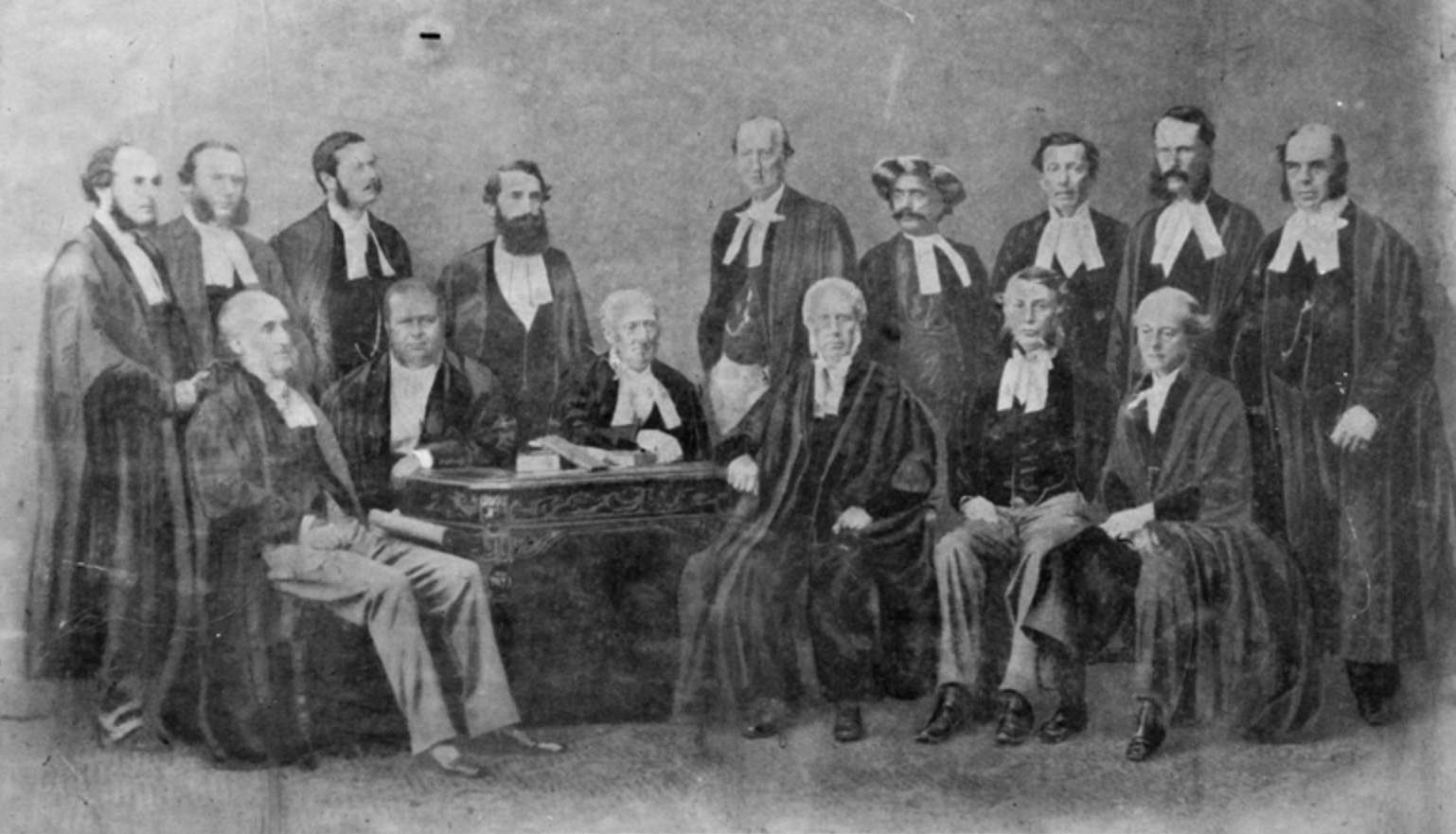
The High Court at Calcutta, 1865; Peacock is the third seated from the right.

In 1859, Sir James Colvile stood down as Chief Justice of the Supreme Court of Judicature at Fort William. Peacock succeeded him in this role and was simultaneously made Vice-President of the Legislative Council of India, as well as receiving a knighthood. In 1862, the Indian judicial institutions were remodelled and Peacock’s position was replaced by the Chief Justice of the High Court at Calcutta, a role he assumed on 1 July.

== Return from India, Privy Council, and death ==
In 1870, Peacock returned to England from India for the last time with a “good and deserved” reputation. From 1872 until his death he was a paid member of the Judicial Committee of the Privy Council. In this role his work was marked with caution, rather than brashness. Amongst other cases he would deliver judgement on Hodge v The Queen, La Banque d'Hochelaga and another v. Murray and others,

Peacock died from heart failure on 3 December 1890, at the age of 85 in his home at 40 Cornwall Gardens in South Kensington. His personal estate at the time of his death was worth £23,325 (£3,756,216 when adjusted for inflation in 2024). He was buried in the terrace catacombs on the west side of Highgate Cemetery.

== Personal life ==
Peacock married Elizabeth Mary Fanning, the daughter of William Fanning, in 1834. The couple had eight children together. Elizabeth died aged 49 in 1865 and was buried in Monghyr, Bengal, India. Many of their children decided to follow him into the Indian civil service and legal system. His eldest son of the first marriage was Frederick Barnes Peacock, CSI.

He secondly married Georgina Showers, the daughter of Major-General St. George Showers. They married at Calcutta in 1870 and remained so until his death. They had two children, Sir Walter Peacock, an advisor to the Prince of Wales, and Herbert St. George Peacock, a judge of the Sudan High Court.

Legal offices
Preceded by Sir James William Colvile	Supreme Court of Judicature at Fort William; 1859–1862	Succeeded by Position abolished
Preceded by New position	Chief Justice of Bengal; 1862–1870	Succeeded by Sir Richard Couch
