= Richard Couch (judge) =

Anglo-Indian judge (1817–1905)

The Right Honourable Sir Richard Couch
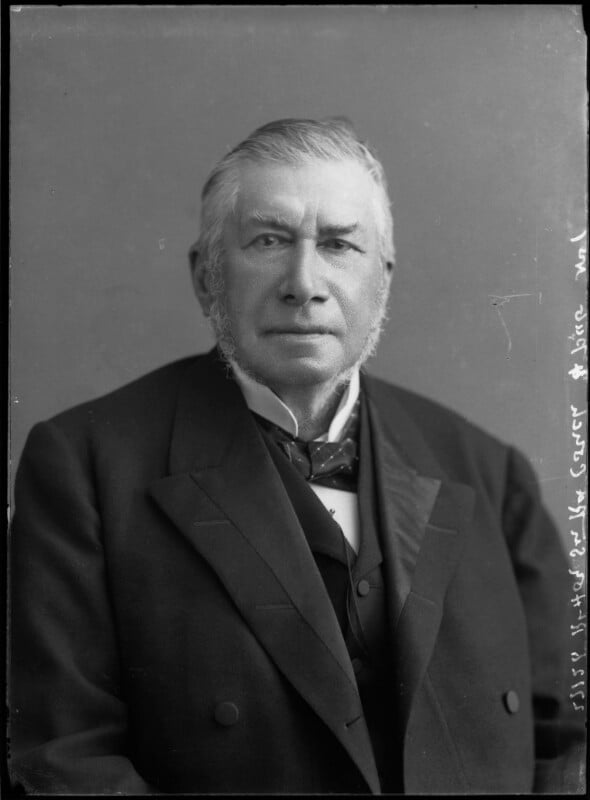
- Sir Richard Couch, uploaded from National Portrait Gallery, London

2nd Chief Justice of Calcutta High Court
- In office 26 April 1870 – 5 April 1875
- Appointed by: Queen Victoria
- Preceded by: Barnes Peacock
- Succeeded by: Richard Garth

2nd Chief Justice of Bombay High Court
- In office 3 March 1866 – 31 March 1870
- Appointed by: Queen Victoria
- Preceded by: Matthew Richard Sausse
- Succeeded by: Michael Roberts Westropp

Judge of Bombay High Court
- In office 14 August 1862 – 2 March 1866
- Appointed by: Queen Victoria

Personal details
- Born: 17 May 1817 England
- Died: 28 November 1905 (aged 88) London, England

Sir Richard Couch (17 May 1817 – 28 November 1905) was an Anglo-Indian judge who served on the colonial courts of India and also on the Judicial Committee of the Privy Council, at that time the court of last resort for the British Empire.

Couch was appointed as Judge of the High Court of Bombay upon its establishment on 14 August 1862 and later became its Chief Justice of on 3 March 1866. He served for four years in that position, before being appointed Chief Justice of the Calcutta High Court, serving in that post from 26 April 1870 to 5 April 1875.

Upon his retirement from the Calcutta High Court, Couch was appointed to the Judicial Committee of the Privy Council in 1881. He sat on numerous appeals from India and Canada.

Legal offices
Preceded by Sir Barnes Peacock	Chief Justice of Bengal; 1870–1875	Succeeded by Sir Richard Garth
