= Rose & Frank Co v JR Crompton & Bros Ltd =

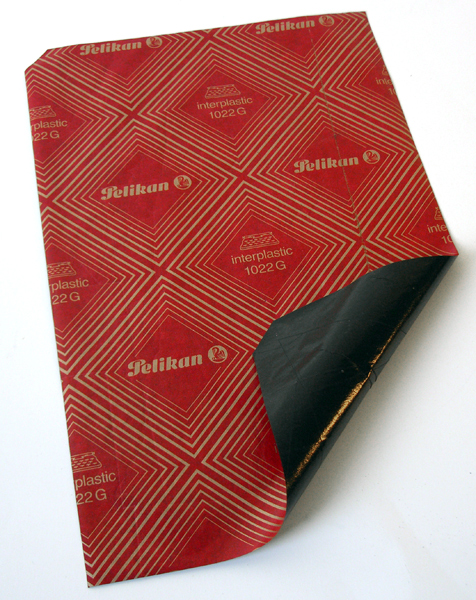
- Court: House of Lords
- Citation: [1924] UKHL 2, [1925] AC 445
- Transcript: Full text of judgment

Case history
- Prior action: [1923] 2 KB 261

Court membership
- Judges sitting: Earl of Birkenhead, Lord Atkinson, Lord Sumner, Lord Buckmaster and Lord Phillimore

Rose & Frank Co v JR Crompton & Bros Ltd [1924] is a leading decision on English contract law, regarding the intention to create legal relations in commercial arrangements. In the Court of Appeal, Atkin LJ delivered an important dissenting judgment which was upheld by the House of Lords.

The case also is an example of the application of the Blue Pencil Rule.

== Facts ==
Rose and Frank Co was the sole US distributor of JR Crompton's carbon paper products. In 1913, the parties signed a new document which included this clause:

This arrangement is not entered into, nor is this memorandum written, as a formal or legal agreement and shall not be subject to legal jurisdiction in the law courts ..., but it is only a definite expression and record of the purpose and intention of the three parties concerned to which they each honourably pledge themselves with the fullest confidence, based upon past business with each other, that it will be carried through by each of the three parties with mutual loyalty and friendly co-operation.

The relationship between the two parties broke down as JR Crompton refused to supply some of the orders of the plaintiff. Rose & Frank Co sued on enforcement of the agreement.

== Judgment ==
At first instance, the court held that the honourable pledge was repugnant to the intention of the rest of the document, and that furthermore the enforceability of such a clause was contrary to public policy. In his decision, Bailhache J. reasoned that the impugned clause was of no effect and that the document was a legally binding contract and enforceable in the court.

=== Court of Appeal ===
Scrutton LJ stated that parties are capable of forming an agreement that does not give rise to legal relations. "The reason of this is that the parties do not intend that their agreement shall give rise to legal relations. This intention may be implied from the subject matter of the agreement, but it may also be expressed by the parties. In social and family relations such an intention is readily implied, while in business matters the opposite result would ordinarily follow."

Atkin LJ agreed that there was no contract, but dissented on the order. He delivered the following judgment:

The first question in this case is whether the document signed by the defendants on July 11, 1913, with a counterpart signed by the plaintiffs on August 12, 1913, constituted a contract between the parties. To create a contract there must be a common intention of the parties to enter into legal obligations, mutually communicated expressly or impliedly. Such an intention ordinarily will be inferred when parties enter into an agreement which in other respects conforms to the rules of law as to the formation of contracts. It may be negatived impliedly by the nature of the agreed promise or promises, as in the case of offer and acceptance of hospitality, or of some agreements made in the course of family life between members of a family as in Balfour v Balfour. If the intention may be negatived impliedly it may be negatived expressly. In this document, construed as a whole, I find myself driven to the conclusion that the clause in question expresses in clear terms the mutual intention of the parties not to enter into legal obligations in respect to the matters upon which they are recording their agreement. I have never seen such a clause before, but I see nothing necessarily absurd in business men seeking to regulate their business relations by mutual promises which fall short of legal obligations, and rest on obligations of either honour or self-interest, or perhaps both. In this agreement I consider the clause a dominant clause, and not to be rejected, as the learned judge thought, on the ground of repugnancy.

I might add that a common instance of effect being given in law to the express intention of the parties not to be bound in law is to be found in cases where parties agree to all the necessary terms of an agreement for purchase and sale, but subject to a contract being drawn up. The words of the preliminary agreement in other respects may be apt and sufficient to constitute an open contract, but if the parties in so agreeing make it plain that they do not intend to be bound except by some subsequent document, they remain unbound though no further negotiation be contemplated. Either side is free to abandon the agreement and to refuse to assent to any legal obligation; when the parties are bound they are bound by virtue only of the subsequent document. On this, the main question, I agree with the judgments of the other members of the Court.

The plaintiffs have an alternative claim against the defendants, J. R. Crompton & Bros., Ld. They say that before 1913 they had been for years doing business with these defendants on the terms of binding agreements terminable on notice, and that if the arrangements made in August, 1913, did not result in contractual relations, the contracts in existence at that date have never been terminated, and they sue for their breach. The defendants, Cromptons, by their defence, para. 12, content themselves with a denial that the agreements in question were in force in 1919, the date of the alleged breach. They do not allege notice to terminate; nor do they allege rescission, as I think technically they should; but their case in substance is that the former agreements were rescinded by mutual consent when the arrangement of August, 1913, was made. If the document of August, 1913, were a contract, there would, I think, be no doubt that the true inference in law would be that by entering into fresh contractual obligations covering the whole field of the former contracts, the parties must be taken to have agreed to rescind the former contracts. But we have now to assume that there were no contractual obligations undertaken in 1913, and the question is, What was the effect of the new arrangement upon existing contracts? This seems to me to be the point reserved by Lord Atkinson in Morris v Barron & Co, where he is considering the effect upon a written contract for the sale of goods of a subsequent parol contract inconsistent with the terms of the first. "If the parol agreement were absolutely void it might possibly be otherwise; but owing to the terms of s. 4 of the Sale of Goods Act 1893, this latter question does not arise in this case, and it is not, in my view, necessary to decide it." There seems to be no difference in principle between a void contract and an agreement which is not a contract; the essence of the matter is that in neither case do the purported stipulations result in legal obligations.

The question raised appears to me difficult. I think it quite conceivable that a man whose express object was that "assured arrangements should be made for the supply of paper for some considerable period ahead" might assent to an honourable understanding extending the period of agency, but might be unwilling to relinquish the only substantial rights he had in his existing agreements; and I think the repeated reference in the record of the honourable understanding to the continued existence of present arrangements would encourage this view. On the other hand, I also think it conceivable, though I personally should think it improbable, that a man having the avowed object referred to would abandon his legal rights for the benefits he hoped to get under the new arrangement. But whatever the true view is, I am of opinion that this Court is not in a position to decide the question for three reasons.

It is plain from the decision in Morris v Baron & Co, adopting the judgment of Willes J. in the Exchequer Chamber in Noble v Ward, that the question of rescission is a question of fact; in Noble v Ward a question for the jury: see per Lord Finlay and Lord Haldane. On this question of fact I do not think we are sufficiently informed of the relevant circumstances to pronounce. It would be necessary to consider what the actual existing contracts were, as constituted by letters and modified, if at all, by subsequent correspondence and course of business. It would be further necessary to consider the circumstances under which the arrangement of July, 1913, was made, and the conduct of the parties under it. The question, though raised in the pleadings and mentioned to the learned judge, was not considered by him, as his construction of the contract made it unnecessary. Some, but very few, of the relevant letters were read before us, the discussion being limited on behalf of the plaintiff for the reason hereinafter given. Under the circumstances, I should come to the conclusion that this matter should be ordered to be retried, even if the two following considerations were not, as I think they are, conclusive.

The judgment in this case provides for a declaration that the agreement of July, 1913, is a legally binding agreement, and that the orders mentioned in para. 18 of the statement of claim constitute legally binding contracts against the defendants, Crompton & Bros., Ld., and then provides that all other issues remaining to be tried should stand over for trial by Bailhache J. or other judge taking the Commercial List. This latter provision gave effect to the agreement of the parties expressed at the trial after the judgment was given. If the learned judge's judgment is reversed as to the declaration of the validity of the agreement of July, 1913, the point as to rescission is an issue remaining to be tried. It never has been tried by the learned judge and, in my opinion, should be tried by him, or some other judge taking the Commercial List, according to the terms of the judgment, and should not be tried by the Court of Appeal.

On the hearing of the appeal we stopped Mr. Wright, counsel for the plaintiff on this point, and intimated that we should send the action back to the learned judge for hearing on the question of rescission. Sir John Simon, in reply, adduced reasons why we should decide this point in his clients' favour, but he did not, as far as I am aware, alter our decision, and Mr. Wright was given no opportunity to discuss the matter further. I can see no justification under the circumstances for deciding the point in this Court, and I agree with the judgment of Bankes L.J. in this respect.

The question of the orders given in 1919 requires separate consideration. I myself am at a loss to understand how the provisions of the arrangement of 1913, whether binding or not, affect the matter. The general relation of the parties was that the plaintiffs were to be the sole vendors of the defendants' goods in the United States of America. Agreements constituting one party sole selling agent in a defined area of the other party's goods are, of course, common. Their special provisions vary; often the agent enters into a correlative obligation that he will not sell within his area any other maker's goods of similar description. Sometimes the manufacturer is under no legal obligation to sell any or any particular amount of goods to the selling agent; sometimes the agent succeeds in putting him under such an obligation. In this case the defendants by the honourable understanding entered into the vague engagement contained in the document which had as a basis the average turnover for the last three years before the agreement. But whatever the terms of the agreement or understanding, it contemplated, as nearly all such agreements do, that the actual business done under it should be done by particular contracts of purchase and sale upon the terms of the general agreement so far as applicable. The actual business was done in this case, as in countless others, by orders for specific goods given by the "agent" and accepted by the manufacturer or merchant. To see whether the orders given were accepted, the terms of the alleged acceptance have to be regarded. In this case I find that after a correspondence as to the possible requirements of the plaintiffs for the whole of the year, the plaintiffs, on January 24, 1919, write: "We have not yet determined the full quantity of paper that we will require from you and Brittains, but realizing that you have no special orders from us, we are sending you orders enclosed which will cover part of our wants for the year 1919." Enclosed were orders all addressed to Messrs. Cromptons: "Please enter our order for the following goods and ship .... to us at ...." The blanks were all filled up by various directions, "When convenient," "As soon as possible," February 1, March 1, April 1, up to December 1, 1919, and the destination was either New York or Toronto. The price and terms are left blank, and I agree with the learned judge that these are sufficiently defined by the course of business between the parties. No question arises before us as to the provisions of s. 4 of the Sale of Goods Act, as it was expressly waived by counsel for the defendants. The order proceeds: "Kindly acknowledge and state when you will ship." The last words obviously mean "Advise us when the time comes of any proposed shipment." The answer is on February 12, 1919: "We .... thank you for the 24 orders for 286 cases of Messrs. Brittains' papers and 8 orders for 64 cases of our paper, to all of which we will give our best attention." Pausing there, this is the common formula of acceptance in the business world which has been treated as acceptance in countless cases since merchants first wrote to one another. It would be understood as an acceptance passing between two merchants where there was no obligation at all on the part of the vendor to accept. Why it should bear a different meaning in a case where there is an honourable understanding by the merchant to accept up to some vague limit, I am unable to understand. The letter continues, "and Messrs. Brittains write us with regard to the orders for their papers that they are endeavouring to let you have deliveries this year up to at least the full 100 per cent. for the standard year ending February 28, 1918, but that at the moment conditions are particularly uncertain." This seems to me to relate to the business likely to be done over the whole year, and particularly to the plaintiffs' statement in the letter of January 24, 1919, under reply that they had not yet determined the full quantity of paper that they would require, and that they would send on further orders later. I read the whole letter as saying "We definitely accept these orders, and as to further orders for Brittains' paper we expect to be able to execute them up to the 1918 quantity, but this is not certain." I cannot think that any business man receiving the letter of February 12 would understand that the writers were making their acceptance conditional on Brittains choosing to supply the goods. If Messrs. Cromptons meant to convey that after using the previous formula, they should have used much more definite language. The remaining orders are order 4661, an order for goods "as soon as possible," sent on February 7 and accepted on February 25: "We thank you for your order .... and we will endeavour to get this through during the next three or four weeks," and six further orders for Brittains' paper sent on March 11, three "at once," and three for July 1 accepted on March 29, 1919: "We thank you for the six orders for Messrs. Brittains' paper which we have passed on to them, and the same will have their best attention." It may be noticed that some of the orders so sent, and, as I think, so accepted, were in fact executed. The dispute is as to the large balance that remained unexecuted. In my view this is a very plain case of acceptance of a written order, and I entirely agree with the judgment of Bailhache J. on this part of the claim. I should vary the order of Bailhache J. by declaring that the agreement of July, 1913, is not a legally binding agreement, but otherwise I should leave the order as it is, allowing the question of rescission to be tried under the order as one of the "other issues remaining to be tried," and I think that there should be no costs of the appeal, but as the other members of the Court have come to a different conclusion, the order will be as proposed by them.

=== House of Lords ===
Lord Phillimore for the House of Lords, held that the arrangement of 1913 was not a legally binding contract. At the date of the arrangement of 1913, all previous agreements were determined by mutual consent, but the orders given and accepted constituted enforceable contracts of sale.

== See also ==
- Baird Textile Holdings Ltd v Marks & Spencer plc [2001] EWCA Civ 274
