= Glasbrook Bros v Glamorgan CC =

English legal case concerning payment for police protection

Glasbrook Bros v Glamorgan County Council [1925]
- Court: House of Lords
- Full case name: Glasbrook Bros v Glamorgan County Council [1925] AC 270
- Decided: 19 December 1924
- Transcript: judgment
- Legislation cited: Police Act, 1840, sect. 19

Court membership
- Judges sitting: Lord Chancellor, Viscount Finlay, Lord Shaw, Lord Carson, Lord Blanesburgh

Glasbrook Brothers Ltd. v Glamorgan County Council [1924] UKHL 3 (19 December 1924) is an English contract law and labour law case concerning the liability of private parties paying for extra police protection.

== Facts ==
During a strike, Glasbrook Brothers (the owners of a colliery) requested police protection in the form of a body of officers quartered on the premises; though the police only had the resources to make visiting patrols, they offered to place constables in exchange for a financial contribution. After the strike, the police presented the colliery with a bill for the provided services; the colliery refused to pay and so the police sued.

The issue before the court was whether the police authority had provided fresh consideration for Glasbrook Bros' promise to pay.

== Judgment ==
The colliery owners repudiated liability on the grounds that there was no consideration for the promise to pay for the police protection and that such an agreement was against public policy. The case was tried by Mr. Justice Bailhache and he entered judgment for the plaintiffs, saying :—

"There is an obligation on the police to afford efficient protection, but if an individual asks for special protection in a particular form, for the special protection so asked for in that particular form, the individual must pay."

This decision was affirmed by a majority on the appeal (Bankes, L.J. and Scrutton, L.J.; Atkin, L.J. dissenting): "The colliery owners now appeal and ask that judgment should be entered for them. It appears to me that there is nothing in the first point made for the colliery owners that there was no consideration for the promise. It is clear that there was abundant consideration. The police authorities thought that it would be best to give protection by means of a flying column of police, but the colliery owners wanted the "garrison" and promised to pay for it if it was sent."

== Significance ==
It has long been accepted that where a party merely does something by which he is already legally bound this can never be sufficient to amount to consideration for an entirely fresh agreement. This basic rule can be seen in operation in Collins v Godfrey [1831] 109 ER 1040.

Glasbrook Bros v Glamorgan County Council is the first major exception to the rule identified. It will be adequate consideration where what is given is more than could have been expected from performance of the existing duty, where in fact something extra is added to what the claimant is already bound to do. The extra element is the consideration for the new promise. This principle will apply where public duty is exceeded as seen in this case.

== See also ==
Stilk v Myrick

The Glamorgan Coal Company v. Glamorganshire Standing Joint Committee (1916, 2 K.B.D)

Ward v Byham [1956] 1 WLR 496 Court of Appeal

North Ocean Shipping Co Ltd v Hyundai Construction Co Ltd
