= Joachimson v Swiss Bank Corporation =

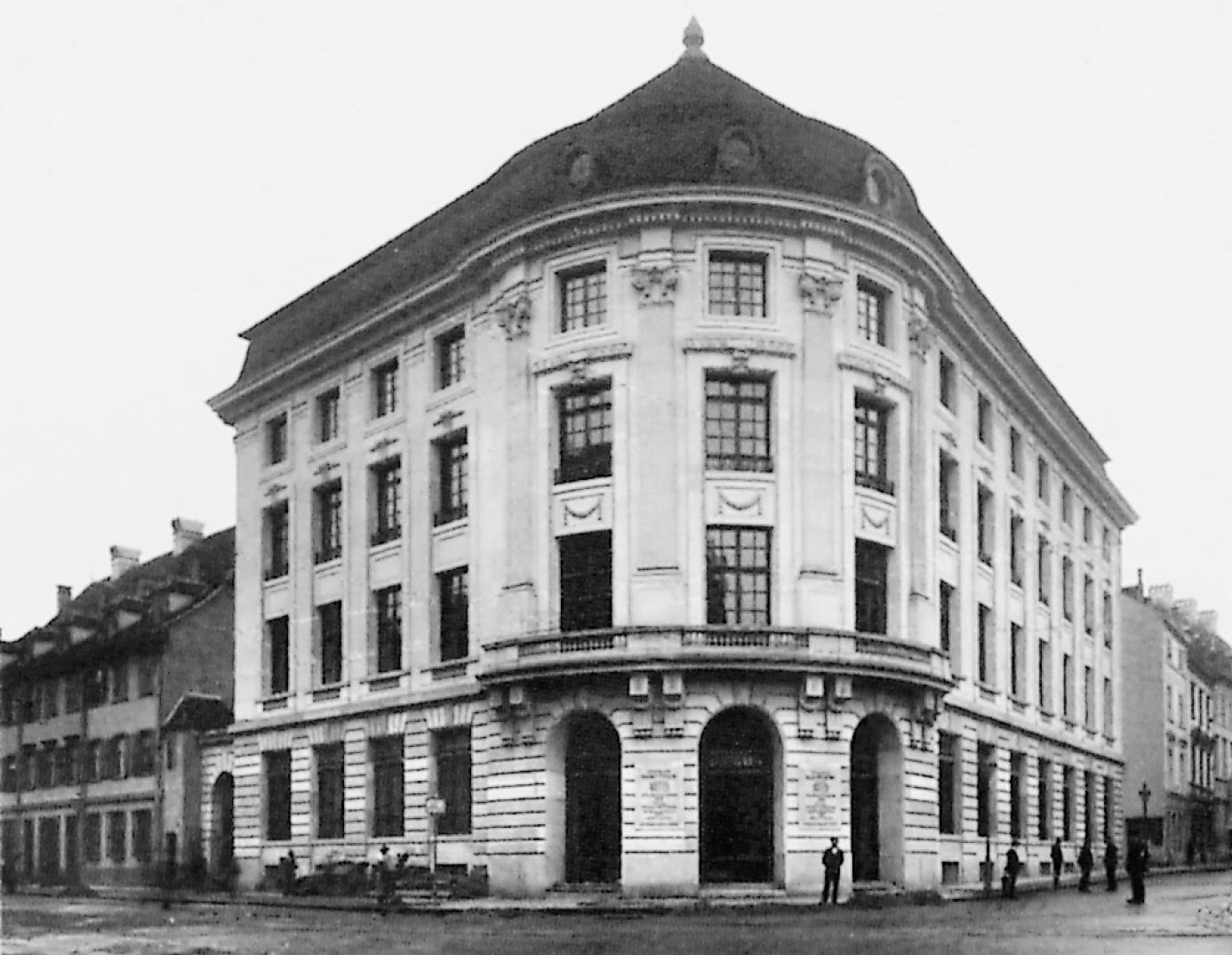
- Swiss Bank Corporation
- Court: Court of Appeal
- Full case name: N. Joachimson (a firm) v Swiss Bank Corporation
- Decided: 11 March 1921
- Citations: [1921] 3 KB 110 (1921) 6 Ll L Rep 435 [1921] All ER Rep 92 (1921) 125 LT 338

Court membership
- Judges sitting: Atkin LJ; Bankes LJ; Warrington LJ

Keywords
- Bank account, limitation periods

Joachimson v Swiss Bank Corporation [1921] 3 KB 110 is a judicial decision of the Court of Appeal of England and Wales in relation to the fundamental nature of the legal relationship between banker and customer. Together with Foley v Hill (1848) 2 HLC 28 it forms part of the foundational cases relating to English banking law and the nature of a bank's relationship with its customer in relation to the account.

The point decided in the case was that a customer does not have a right of action against its bank for repayment of sums until the customer makes a demand (and accordingly, for the purposes of limitation periods, that time does not run until such a demand is made). However, the reason the decision is considered so important is for the influential comments made by way of obiter dictum by Atkin LJ in relation to the nature of the banker-customer relationship.

The case is also cited as the leading authority for the proposition that a demand for repayment must be made at the branch of the bank where the account is kept; a position which appears increasingly anachronistic in modern banking.

== Facts ==
Siegfried Joachimson, Jacob Joachimson and L.E. Marckx jointly operated a business in Manchester as a partnership. L.E. Marckx was a naturalised British citizen, but the other two partners were German nationals. The firm opened and operated a bank account with the Swiss Bank Corporation.

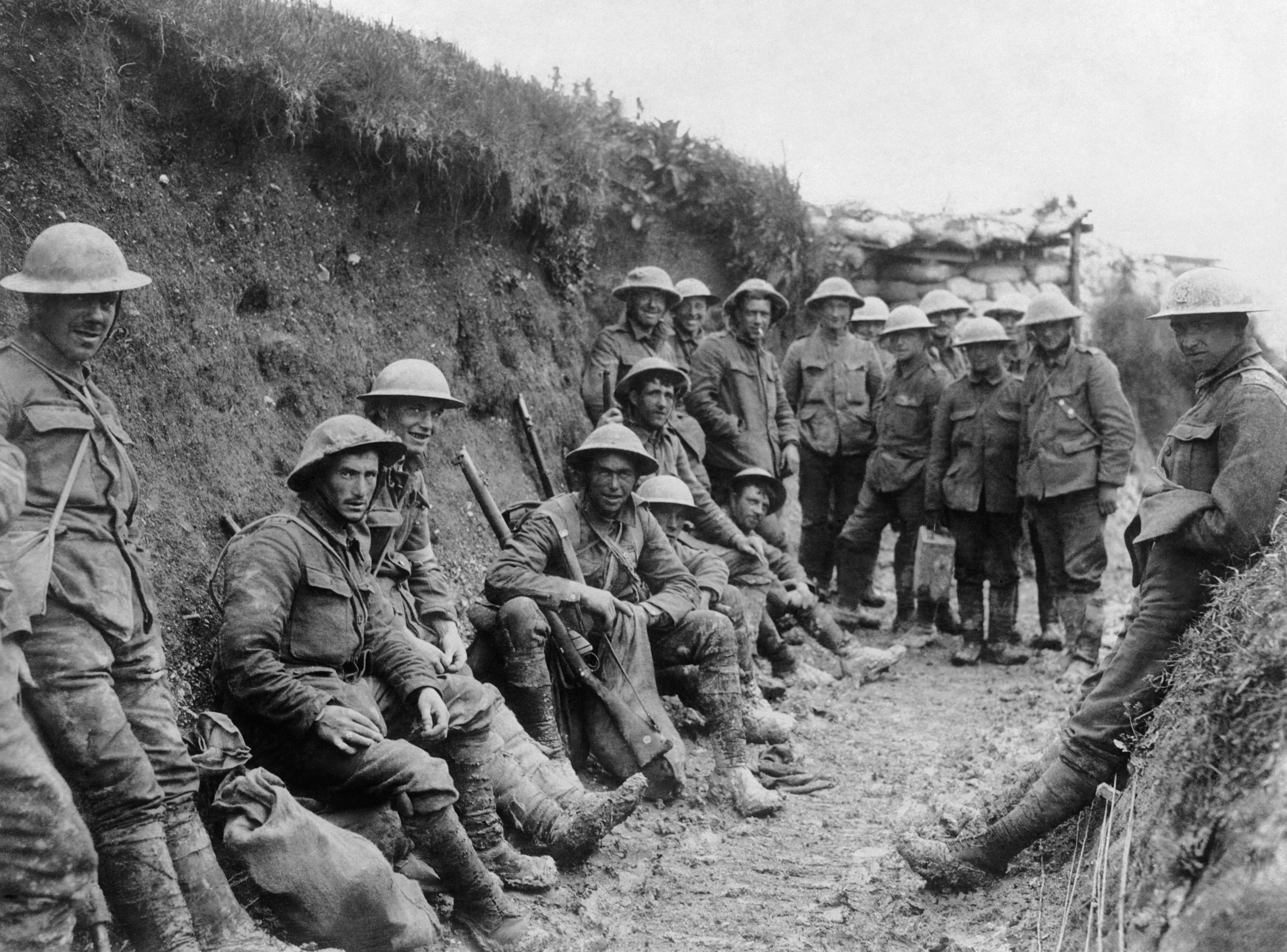
No attempt was made to wind up the partnerships' affairs during World War I.

On 1 August 1914 Siegfried Joachimson died. Under English partnership law at the time, this had the effect of dissolving the partnership. However three days later, on 4 August 1914, World War I broke out, and Jacob Joachimson returned to Germany. The firm's account with the bank was dormant for the duration of the war; the case report suggests that this might have been because of legal prohibitions relating to property of enemy aliens. After the war, the English partner, L.E. Marckx, tried to wind up the affairs of the partnership, and sought repayment of the £2,312 held in the bank account from the bank. The bank refused to repay the sums in the account arguing that either (i) the firm had made no demand for repayment of the sums, and so they were not due; or in the alternative (ii) that if the right to repayment arose upon the death of Siegfried Joachimson, then it was now barred by the statute of limitation.

The case report indicates that there was a great deal of procedural wrangling at first instance in relation to whether the claim could be brought by an individual partner or had to be brought in the name of the firm.

== Decision ==
The Court of Appeal held unanimously that the claim was not statute barred. Until a customer demanded repayment from the bank, the debt was not due and payable, and thus limitation periods would not run. Bankes LJ held:

It seems to me impossible to imagine the relation between banker and customer, as it exists today, without the stipulation that, if the customer seeks to withdraw his loan, he must make application to the banker for it...

== (1921) 3 KB 110 ==
The case is treated as important because of the fundamental principles which Atkin LJ set down in relation to the nature of the account. He said:

The bank undertakes to receive money and to collect bills for its customer's account. The proceeds so received are not to be held in trust for the customer, but the bank borrows the proceeds and undertakes to repay them. The promise to repay is to repay at the branch of the bank where the account is kept, and during banking hours. It includes a promise to repay any part of the amount due against the written order of the customer addressed to the bank at the branch, and as such written orders may be outstanding in the ordinary course of business for two or three days, it is a term of the contract that the bank will not cease to do business with the customer except on reasonable notice. The customer on his part undertakes to exercise reasonable care in executing his written orders so as not to mislead the bank or facilitate forgery.

The decision was handed down at a time when banks were transforming from a service available only to the very wealthy to a more mainstream part of daily commerce. Ellinger's Modern Banking Law suggests that, taken together with Foley v Hill, the case established six fundamental propositions:

1. For a current or savings account (as opposed to a fixed term deposit account), sums are only repayable upon demand.
2. The demand for repayment must be made at the branch of the bank where the account is kept unless there is a contrary agreement between the bank and the customer.
3. Even without a demand, the sums held on account become repayable immediately if the bank is wound up.
4. The limitation period on the debt runs from the time when the customer makes demand and is refused.
5. The nature of the relationship between the banker and customer is fundamentally one of debtor and creditor, but banks also provide other services to their customers which cannot be described in debtor-customer terms, such as the obligation of the bank to honour cheques and payment instructions, and to collect sums paid into the account by way of cheque.
6. The legal position in relation to the banker-customer is largely expressed as being constituted by implied terms, and accordingly, can be modified by express agreement.

Some care needs to be taken with the last proposition: much of English law at the time was expressed in terms of "implied agreements" and "quasi contract"; a position which academics have pointed out should be deprecated and recognised that the courts were simply laying down legal rules and not implied agreements.
