= Frank Douglas MacKinnon =

British judge and writer (1871–1946)

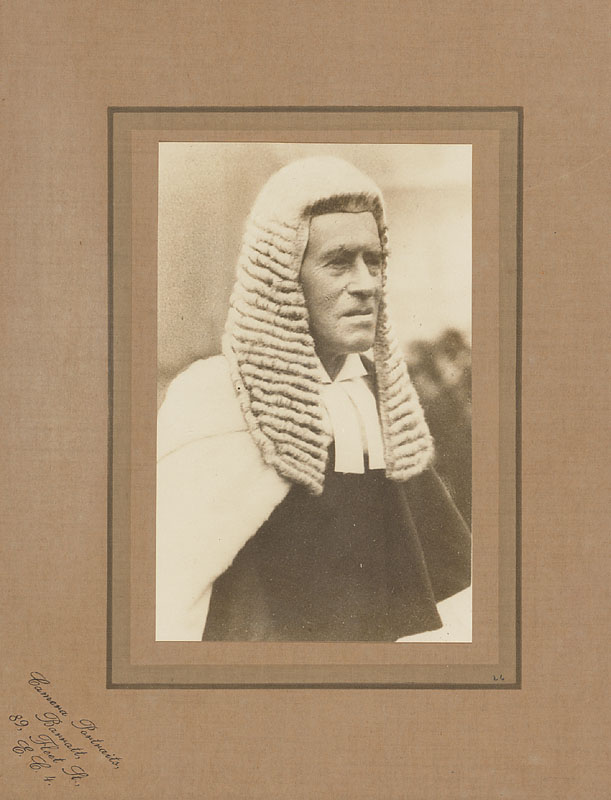
Sir Frank Douglas MacKinnon.

Sir Frank Douglas MacKinnon (11 February 1871 – 23 January 1946) was an English lawyer, judge and writer, the only High Court judge to be appointed during the First Labour Government.

== Early life and legal practice ==
Born in Highgate, London, the eldest son of 7 children of Benjamin Thomas, a Lloyd's underwriter and Katherine née Edwards, he attended Highgate School and Trinity College, Oxford, graduating in classics (1892) and literae humaniores (1894). MacKinnon was called to the bar by the Inner Temple in 1897 and became a pupil of Thomas Edward Scrutton where he was a contemporary of James Richard Atkin, later to become Lord Atkin. When Scrutton became a QC in 1901, MacKinnon benefited from Scrutton's former junior practice in commercial law. MacKinnon's brother, Sir Percy Graham MacKinnon (1872–1956) was, from time to time, chairman of Lloyd's of London and his family connections helped build his practice.

MacKinnon married Frances Massey in 1906 and the couple had two children. He became a KC in 1914 and found the circumstances of World War I led him to extensive practice in prize law. The war also generated many complex contractual disputes and MacKinnon developed a reputation for handling such cases with skill. Many issues such as frustration of contract attracted his attention and his pen.

He began to establish a reputation as a jurist and to advise the government on mercantile law, especially its international dimension.

== High Court judge ==
In October 1924, the minority Labour government was suffering the repercussions of the Campbell case and was not expected to survive. When Sir Clement Bailhache died, Lord Chancellor Richard Haldane, 1st Viscount Haldane was anxious that the appointment of a High Court judge was not made "in the last agony of the government's existence". The appointment was made in some haste.

MacKinnon sat in the Commercial Court but also went on circuit with the assizes. Criminal law and juries had never formed a material part of his practice but he adapted well though his reputation as a judge never matched his standing as a lawyer.

In 1926, he chaired a committee to review the law on arbitration. The committee concluded that the Arbitration Act 1889 (52 & 53 Vict. c. 49) had been effective and recommended only some miscellaneous amendments. The recommendations were only partly implemented in the Arbitration Act 1928 and the Arbitration Act 1934 (24 & 25 Geo. 5. c. 14).

== Lord Justice of Appeal ==
In 1937, MacKinnon was elevated to the Court of Appeal and sworn into the Privy Council. A pragmatist, he may have had a greater impact had he not felt so impatient as to never reserve judgment. He was considered for the House of Lords in 1938 but Samuel Porter, Baron Porter was preferred.

He was one of those judges who, on occasion, causes amusement through their unfamiliarity with popular culture. In a notorious libel trial in 1943, the court was viewing a photograph from the magazine Lilliput showing a well-known male fashion designer juxtaposed next to a pansy. MacKinnon had to ask Rayner Goddard to explain the innuendo. Towards the end of his life he confessed to neither owning nor intending to own a "wiresless set".

He also gained some notoriety for doubting the grounds of the leading negligence case of Donoghue v. Stevenson. About the case, which involved a snail in a bottle of ginger beer, MacKinninon said, in his 1942 Holdsworth lecture:

I detest that snail ... when the law had been settled by the House of Lords, the case went back to Edinburgh to be tried on the facts. And at that trial it was found that there never was a snail in the bottle at all! That intruding gasterpod [sic] was as much a legal fiction as the Casual Ejector.

Lord Normand, the defendant's advocate, always insisted that MacKinnon's allegation was untrue.

== Trials as judge ==
- Southern Foundries (1926) Ltd v Shirlaw [1939] 2 KB 206 – in which he defined the "officious bystander test" for implied contractual terms.
- Salisbury (Marquess) v. Gilmore [1942] – in which Tom Denning KC attempted to argue that the doctrine of estoppel should be extended to promises rather than solely statements of fact. MacKinnon rejected the argument but Denning had his way once he was a High Court judge in Central London Property Trust Ltd v. High Trees House Ltd (1947).
- R v. Home Secretary, ex parte Greene [1942] 1 KB 87 – sitting with Lords Justice of Appeal Scott and Goddard, the court rejected Ben Greene's application for a writ of habeas corpus to review his detention under Defence Regulation 18B. The court ruled that it could not question the discretion of the Home Secretary, honestly exercised. Greene appealed to the House of Lords who, in Liversidge v. Anderson, confirmed the Court of Appeal's decision.

== Other interests ==
MacKinnon was an enthusiast for the writing and culture of the eighteenth century and, in particular, the work of Doctor Johnson. He wrote extensively on the period. He also considered Victorian architecture to have ruined much of what came before. When the Temple Church was bombed during The Blitz, he welcomed it with mixed feelings:

Smirke, Cottingham, Willement, and the rest of the gang … To have got rid of their awful stained glass windows, their ghastly pulpit, their hideous encaustic tiles, their abominable pews and seats (on which alone they spent over £10,000) will be almost a blessing in disguise.

Never interested in party politics, MacKinnon was president of the Average Adjusters' Association (1935), of the Johnson Society of Lichfield (1933), and of the Buckinghamshire Archaeological Society, chairman of Buckinghamshire quarter sessions, and member of the Historical Manuscripts Commission.

MacKinnon was a keen walker, climbing Snowdon on two consecutive days in February 1931 when aged almost 60.

== Personal ==
"In appearance MacKinnon possessed bushy eyebrows, penetrating eyes, a pronounced angular nose, and firm mouth." His daughter, son-in-law and young grandchild were lost aboard the Almeda Star, torpedoed in 1941. His son became bursar of Eton College. Following a sudden heart attack, he died in Charing Cross Hospital.

== Honours ==
- Inner Temple:
  - Bencher (1923);
  - Treasurer (1945);
- Knighted (1924);
- Honorary fellow of Trinity College, Oxford (1931)
- Fellow of the Society of Antiquaries

== Bibliography ==
=== By MacKinnon ===
- MacKinnon, F. D. (1917) Effect of War on Contract
- — (1926) "Some aspects of commercial law"
- — (ed.) (1930) Burney, F. Evelina
- — (1933) "The law and the lawyers" in Turberville, A. S. (ed.) Johnson's England: An Account of the Life and Manners of his Age, Oxford: Clarendon Press
- — (1935) The Murder in the Temple and Other Holiday Tasks, London: Sweet & Maxwell
- — (1936) "The origins of commercial law", Law Quarterly Review, 52 30
- — (1937) Grand Larceny
- — (1940) On Circuit: 1924–1937, Cambridge: Cambridge University Press
- — (1945a) The Ravages of the War in the Inner Temple
- — (1945b) "An unfortunate preference", Law Quarterly Review, 61 237–8
- — (1948) Inner Temple Papers, London: Stevens & Co.
- — (ed.) [various editions] Scrutton on Charterparties and Bills of Lading

=== Obituaries ===
- ALG (1946) "F. D. M., 1871–1946", Law Quarterly Review, 62 139–40
- The Times, 24 January 1946

=== About MacKinnon ===
- Birkett, N. (1949) "Review of Inner Temple papers", Law Quarterly Review, 65 380–84
- Rubin, G. R. (2004) "MacKinnon, Sir Frank Douglas (1871–1946)", Oxford Dictionary of National Biography, Oxford University Press. Retrieved 2 August 2007 (subscription, Wikipedia Library access or UK public library membership required)
