= Banque Belge pour L'Etranger v Hambrouck =

1921 English court case

Banque Belge pour L’Etranger v Hambrouck
- Court: Court of Appeal of England and Wales
- Decided: 5 November 1920
- Citation: [1921] 1 KB 321

Court membership
- Judges sitting: Atkin LJ; Bankes LJ; Scrutton LJ

Case opinions
- Atkin LJ

Keywords
- Knowing receipt, tracing

Banque Belge pour L’Etranger v Hambrouck [1921] 1 KB 321 is an English trusts law case concerning the common law remedies for receipt of trust property.

== Facts ==
Mr Hambrouck forged cheques so £6000 came out of the account of Mr Pelabon at the Banque Belge pour l'Étranger, his employer, and was put into his own Farrow’s Bank account. Then Mr Hambrouck took out money and paid his mistress Mlle Spanoghe, who gave no consideration. She paid the money to her account at the London Joint City and Midland Bank, where she had £315 credit. Banque Belge sued Mr Hambrouck, Mlle Spanoghe and the London Bank for the money. The London Bank paid the money into court.

Salter J held the money should be repaid.

== Judgment ==
The Court of Appeal held that the money should be repaid. Atkin LJ noted the argument of Hambrouck that title could not be asserted because after passing through other bank accounts, it could no longer be identified. But In re Hallett’s Estate said that was not a problem because any transfer to an innocent donee would defeat an original owner’s claim. He said the following.

At present it appears to me that the plaintiff Bank intended to pass the property in and the possession of the cash which under the operations of the clearing house they must be taken to have paid to the collecting bank. I will assume therefore that this is a case not of a void but of a voidable transaction by which Hambrouck obtained a title to the money until the plaintiffs elected to avoid his title, which they did when they made their claim in this action. The title would then revest in the plaintiffs subject to any title acquired in the meantime by any transferee for value without notice of the fraud. ...I venture to doubt whether the common law ever so restricted the right as to hold that the money became incapable of being traced, merely because paid into the broker’s general account with his banker. The question always was, Had the means of ascertainment failed? But if in 1815 the common law halted outside the bankers’ door, by 1879 equity had had the courage to lift the latch, walk in and examine the books: In re Hallett’s Estate. I see no reason why the means of ascertainment so provided should not now be available both for common law and equity proceedings.

Bankes LJ and Scrutton LJ gave concurring judgments, although somewhat narrower in scope.

== Aftermath ==
In Agip (Africa) Ltd v Jackson, Fox LJ held that a claim at common law could not succeed, because Agip’s money had been mixed in the New York clearing system and could not therefore be traced. An equitable claim, although more restrictive in application, was still available against some of the defendants. In distinguishing the case from Banque Belge, he said:

Atkin LJ's approach in the Banque Belge case amounts virtually to saying that there is now no difference between the common law and equitable remedies. Indeed, the common law remedy might be wider because of the absence of any requirement of a fiduciary relationship. There may be a good deal to be said for that view but it goes well beyond any other case and well beyond the views of Bankes and Scrutton LJJ. And in the 70 years since the Banque Belge decision it has not been applied. Whether, short of the House of Lords, it is now open to the courts to adopt it I need not consider.

Ellinger's Modern Banking Law viewed the two cases as reaching substantially the same conclusion:

The orthodox position, as reflected in the judgments of Bankes and Scrutton LJJ in the Hambrouck case, and in the reasoning of Millet J, as approved by the Court of Appeal, in Agip, is that money cannot be traced at common law once it gets mixed or commingled with other funds...

The reasoning in Banque Belge has also helped to expand the application of Norwich Pharmacal orders. In Bankers Trust v Shapira, Denning MR observed:

He is entitled, in Atkin LJ’s words, to lift the latch of the bankers’ door....The customer, who has prima facie been guilty of fraud, cannot bolt the door against him. Owing to his fraud, he is disentitled from relying on the confidential relationship between him and the bank.

== See also ==
- English trusts law
