= Oswald Hickson =

English lawyer and cricketer

Oswald Squire Hickson (2 April 1877 – 9 January 1944) was an English lawyer, particularly known for his work in defamation litigation and in human rights cases during the Second World War.

As a youth, Hickson played cricket for Northamptonshire in 1897 and 1898 in the Minor Counties Championship. He was educated at University College, London and admitted as a solicitor in 1902. He started work in London and helped build the reputation of the firm Oswald Hickson, Collier and Co..

During the Second World War, Hickson came to act for a number of people interned in England under Defence Regulation 18B, most famously Ben Greene, whose appeal against detention was ultimately rejected by the House of Lords in the landmark case of Liversidge v. Anderson (sic). Greene's brother, Edward, described Hickson: "He rather reminded me of a character out of Dickens; big fellow, huge fellow, hair standing all on end."

Greene was eventually released when the MI5 agent provocateur Harald Kurtz, who had given the key evidence against him, was exposed, largely through Hickson's efforts.

He served on the Lord Chancellor's committee to report on the Law of Defamation.

== Bibliography ==
- Simpson, A. W. B. (1992). In the Highest Degree Odious: Detention without Trial in Wartime Britain. Oxford: Oxford University Press. ISBN 0-19-825775-9.
- "Hickson, Oswald Squire". Who Was Who 1897-2006. 2007.
