= Russian Commercial and Industrial Bank v Comptoir d'Estcompte de Mulhouse =

- Court: House of Lords
- Citation: [1925] AC 112
- Transcript: judgment

Case history
- Prior action: [1923] 2 KB 630

Court membership
- Judges sitting: Viscount Cave, Viscount Finlay, Lord Atkinson, Lord Sumner, and Lord Wrenbury

Keywords
- Corporate personality, authority

Russian Commercial and Industrial Bank v Comptoir d'Estcompte de Mulhouse [1925] AC 112 is a UK company law and banking case, concerning the authority of an officer of a company to carry out its actions, and a company's existence as a legal person.

== Facts ==
The Russian Commercial and Industrial Bank's head office was in Petrograd in 1914. It had a branch in London. The branch manager had power of attorney to transact business and sue in the bank's name. By the Petrograd office's direction, the London branch deposited Brazilian and Chinese government bonds with a London bank, to be held as security for the French bank, Comptoir d'Estcompte, for an account opened by Comptoir d'Estcompte for Russian Commercial and Industrial Bank. In 1918, the Bolshevik government nationalised Russian banking, taking over all assets, share capital and management of private banking, and vesting them in a state bank, then the People's Bank, and then a government department. The London branch manager agreed with the French bank to pay off the amount of money it owed to the French bank, in return for the bonds. The money was paid, but the French bank refused to return the bonds.

== Judgment ==
=== Court of Appeal ===
The Court of Appeal held by a majority that the French bank could keep the bonds. Bankes LJ and Scrutton LJ held that because of nationalisation, the Russian bank ceased to exist, and it therefore had no authority to direct the manager of the London branch to allow Russian Commercial and Industrial Bank to bring the action. Moreover, the French bank was not precluded by estoppel from relying on absence of authority as a defence.

Atkin LJ dissented. In the course of his judgment he wrote the following.

We are quite familiar in our law with the position that a company may lose all its assets, may have no directors administering the affairs of the company, or have the powers of the directors transferred in the course of liquidation to an officer of the Court, may have all its assets distributed amongst the shareholders, and yet remain a legal entity until a formal dissolution: see the Companies (Consolidation) Act 1908 ss. 175 and 195. But if there were a doubt on the construction of the decrees themselves of December, 1917, and January, 1918, the problem appears to me to be solved when one looks to the circumstances at the time of the decrees, the subsequent acts of the Government both by orders and dealings with the branch in question. The Russian banks in 1917 had and continued to have branches elsewhere than in the territory in fact controlled by the Soviet Government. Not only were there branches in parts of Russia over which the Soviet Government only gradually assumed power, but there were branches in various financial centres such as Paris, London, and elsewhere. Moreover banking business involves the creation and performance of obligations extending over periods of time, to secure the benefit of which it is for business purposes essential that the contracting party should continue to exist without a diminution of credit. The Soviet Government were fully aware of these facts, and it appears to me probable that they would keep alive the banks, though taking them and their assets into complete State control, rather than at one blow destroy them and all assets depending on what we call rights of action. In any case the evidence shows that this is what they did. The administration of the old banks continued till April, 1918, and was then transferred to the State Bank. The branches of the old bank continued though under the new style of a branch of the State Bank, a position very familiar as the result of bank amalgamations in this country, though entirely consistent with the continued existence of the old bank. Cheques were honoured addressed to the old bank. The order or decree of December 10, 1918, seems to me to be only consistent with a recognition of the actual existence of the Russian Banks up to that moment....

After the late summer of 1918 communications with Russia practically ceased, but that the official view of the continued existence of Russian banks remained what I have stated is reasonably clear from two drafts put in evidence during the last adjournment, and addressed to the London branch of another Russian bank, the Russo-Asiatic Bank, by a Mutual Credit Society of Petrograd, which itself, by the way, was the subject of similar legislation to that affecting the banks. That draft is dated November 11, 1922, and is drawn in Petrograd. It is addressed to the Russo-Asiatic Bank, 64, Old Broad Street, London, in these terms:- "Dear Sirs, I request you kindly to hold at the disposal of the Petrograd Society of Mutual Credit, the sum of 300 (Three hundred) Pounds Sterling at debit of my current account with you. Yours faithfully, TCHATCHKOFF." The signature of Tchatchkoff is certified by the Crédit Mutuel de Petrograd. Petrograd Society of Mutual Credit. It is indorsed: "Pay to the order of the State Bank, North West District Branch, Petrograd, value in account. Crédit Mutuel de Petrograd. Petrograd Society of Mutual Credit," and is further indorsed: "Pay to the Order of the Russian Trade Delegation in England, London, value in account. Petrograd, November 16, 1922. State Bank, North West District Branch." Therefore that draft drawn in Petrograd on November 11, 1922, addressed to the Russo-Asiatic Bank, when that bank, according to the view put forward by the defendants in this case, was dead, and had been dead for five years, is indorsed by several banking institutions, in Russia, and eventually comes into the possession, of all people, of the Russian Trade Delegation in England, and they apparently get payment of it in the ordinary course. Certainly if the Soviet Government killed the Russian bank in January, 1918, they are imputing remarkable activities to the corpse. It may be noticed that in the case of the Russo-Asiatic Bank neither the Board of Trade nor the bank itself seems to have been aware that it was dead, for on December 18, 1922, Russell J. gave judgment against the bank in an action of the Dresdner Bank v. Russo-Asiatic Bank in an action brought by the authority of the Controller under an order made in respect of the Dresdner Bank under the Trading with the Enemy Amendment Act, 1916. Apparently the banks are dead to their debtors but not to their creditors.

Pressed by some of the above facts the defendants appeared inclined during the argument to fall back upon the later decree of 1920 abolishing the State Bank and transferring its functions to a State Department. Either the Bank was destroyed in 1918 it is said, or being amalgamated with the State Bank, that institution was destroyed in 1920 and nothing further remains. This involves throwing over their pleading and their witnesses who pledged themselves to the destruction at the latest by the decree of January 26, 1918. Moreover it does not appear to assist the argument. A bank cannot at the same time be dead and not dead, and if not dead in the months of 1918, it remained alive, and had an existence independent of the State Bank, and the termination of the State Bank appears to have no particular effect on the private bank. The control of the business which had been confiscated might as well be in the hands of a State department as of a State corporation, and might so continue consistently with the existence of the Bank as a juridical person.

For the above reasons I have come to the conclusion that the defendants have not established their plea that the plaintiff corporation no longer exists. I venture to think that their witnesses have assumed too readily that nationalization involves extinction, and have not given sufficient weight to the consideration that a business may be nationalized or amalgamated without the persons who owned the business being extinguished.

Having come to the conclusion that the plaintiff Bank still remains a juridical person capable of maintaining suit in this country, I can deal with the remaining questions more shortly. The point upon which the learned judge decided the case was that the manager of the London branch, Mr. Jones, had no authority on behalf of the bank to bring the present action. The authority of the agent is to be determined by the law of the country where the agency is created, in this case Russia; and it would probably be sufficient to rely upon the statement of Mr. Krougliakoff, the expert lawyer called by the defendants, that if the old Bank had still been in existence, Mr. Jones' power of attorney would be still valid. But there appear to be two answers to the defendants' contention. The power of attorney is an authority given by the Bank as a legal person, and it in terms validates on behalf of the Bank whatsoever may be legally done between the date of revocation by any means of these presents and the time when the revocation becomes known to the Acting Manager pro tempore. The alleged revocation is the change in the administration of the company from the directors to the State Bank, or the Soviet Government, and I am not disposed to dispute the view that without express provision such a change might operate to discharge the servants of the company, and so revoke the authority of the manager. But such a revocation is within the express terms of the power of attorney and cannot be said to have come to the knowledge of the manager until the date in May, 1921, when this Government, for the first time, recognized the Soviet Government, a date long after the inception of the action. In the second place, even if the authority had been revoked, it appears to me plain that it was renewed by the new authority responsible for the administration of the affairs of the Bank. That the Soviet Government knew that there was a London branch is obvious, that they knew that it was continuing to carry on business in the name of the Russian Bank is established by the correspondence to some of which I have already referred, and also by the fact that they intended it to carry on business. Indeed without this correspondence I should have drawn that inference from the knowledge of the existence of the branch and the knowledge of the nature of banking business. They reply to letters written by Mr. Jones on behalf of the Bank and accept his business directions. They must be deemed to have intended that some one should carry on the business of the Bank in this country, and in the ordinary case of a private principal I cannot conceive of any one refusing to draw the inference that authority was impliedly given to the former manager to carry on as before with the former authority. Such an inference under the circumstances would, in my judgment, be a matter of course if we were dealing with an official liquidator or receiver and manager in Russia permitting a branch to be continued here, and I refuse to draw a different inference merely because we are dealing with a foreign Government. I desire to add that even if there were a question of defective authority to sue, in my judgment it was not open to the defendants to raise the point as a matter of defence. The judgment of Warrington J. in the case of Richmond v Branson appears to me to state the law in a matter of this kind, where the question is whether the action has been brought with the authority of an existing principal, himself capable of suing. In that case the learned judge says:

"But the real question is the authority of the solicitor. Is that a question which can be raised as a relevant issue in the action and at the trial? No authority has been cited in support of the affirmative of such a proposition, and, in my opinion, it is impossible, according to the ordinary practice and procedure of the Court, to justify that proposition. The business of this Court could not be carried on if one were not entitled to assume the authority of the solicitor unless and until that authority has been disputed and shewn not to exist in the proper form of proceeding, namely, a substantive application on the part of the parties concerned to stay the proceedings on the ground of want of authority."

The Daimler Case does not appear to be inconsistent with this view. That was a case where no retainer could be given at all, and in such a case the Court may very well refuse to hear the action on being informed of the facts. This appears to be the ground of the decision in the joint opinion of Lord Parker and Lord Sumner. They say:

"When the Court in the course of an action becomes aware that the plaintiff is incapable of giving any retainer at all, it ought not to allow the action to proceed. It clearly would not do so in the case of an infant plaintiff, and I can see no difference in principle between the case of an infant and the case of a company which has no directors or other officers capable of giving instructions for the institution of legal proceedings."

There the only persons controlling the company were personally incapacitated from giving instructions to sue because they were alien enemies. Here the position is entirely different; the administration is ex hypothesi in the hands of a friendly government, who could undoubtedly direct an action to be commenced in the name of the existing Bank. They are in the position of ordinary principals, and I have never heard of any plea having been formulated which would entitle the defendant to raise at the hearing a defence that, though the plaintiff had the right to sue, he had not in fact authorized the particular action. If it were a valid plea, one would expect to find some trace of it in the books during the last 500 years.

As to the suggestion emanating originally from the French Bank that this was a head office transaction, and therefore one that should not be put in suit on instructions from London, the answer appears to be that the plaintiffs are the same corporation in London or in Russia or in Paris. The point is really one of authority to sue, with which I have already dealt. But it may be added that the sterling bonds which were redeemed by the agreement had originally come from the custody of the London branch, and it appears to me to be well within the authority of the London manager to take steps to redeem such bonds when the occasion was a profitable one, both for the Bank as a whole and, so far as there was any separation of business interests, for the branch. But in any case the French Bank, having knowingly received money from the London branch (which, by the way, it still retains), and having promised to return the bonds to that branch, cannot thereafter dispute the authority of the London branch to complete the transaction. It will receive a complete discharge if it returns the bonds on the order of a Court of competent jurisdiction. Akin to this last contention was the suggestion that the bonds now belong to the Soviet Government. It is possible that they do; to determine whether they do or not, it would be necessary to consider how far the Soviet legislation has extra-territorial operation in respect of movables, a matter which, in my judgment, it is unnecessary to consider. I think it plain that the French Bank, having received the bonds from the Russian Bank, is estopped from raising the jus tertii unless it acts on behalf and with the authority of the third person whose right of property it sets up: Rogers v. Lambert. This it is not suggested that the French Bank can or desires to do.

An attempt was made by the plaintiffs to support their case, should there be found to be a want of authority, by putting forward a ratification by the liquidator. I am not satisfied that the liquidator of a branch business of a company registered abroad and having its head and seat abroad is so clothed with the authority of the principal as to be competent to ratify an act not within the authority of the branch here, and I should not support the claim on that ground if it were otherwise unfounded.

In the result this case resolves itself into the simple position of a claim against a mortgagee who has been paid off and who holds both the security and the sum repaid.

In my opinion the defence should meet with its just reward, which is that judgment should be given for the plaintiffs for the relief claimed, with costs.

=== House of Lords ===
The House of Lords overturned the Court of Appeal and endorsed the dissenting judgment of Atkin LJ.

== See also ==
- UK company law
