= Barron v Potter =

Legal case in the United Kingdom

- Court: High Court, Chancery Division
- Decided: 13 March 1914
- Citation: [1914] 1 Ch 895

Case opinions
- Warrington J

Keywords
- Board of directors, deadlock, general meeting

Barron v Potter [1914] 1 Ch 895 is a UK company law case, concerning the balance of power between the board of directors and the general meeting. It stands for the principle that when the board is incapable of taking action, power to conduct the company's affairs will revert to the general meeting.

== Facts ==
Canon Barron was not on speaking terms with Mr. William James Potter, the other director of the British Seagumite Co Ltd. Their office was 28 Fleet Street. The constitution said that the quorum for a meeting was two (art 26). Mr. Potter was the chairman, with a casting vote. But Canon Barron was refusing to come to meetings. So on 23 February 1914, Mr. Potter came to meet Canon Barron, as he got off the train on a Paddington Station platform, from his country home (Woodham Ferrers, Essex). He told Canon Barron they were now holding a board meeting. He proposed appointing more directors. Canon Barron objected. Mr. Potter said he was using his casting vote, and declared the motion effective. The report recorded Mr. Potter's version of the exchange as follows:

Accordingly on February 23 he met the train at Paddington by which he expected Canon Barron to arrive, and seeing him alight from it walked by his side along the platform and said to him, “I want to see you, please.” Canon Barron replied, “I have nothing to say to you.” Mr. Potter then said, “I formally propose that we add the Reverend Charles Herbert, Mr. William George Walter Barnard, and Mr. John Tolehurst Musgrave as additional directors to the board of the British Seagumite Company Limited. Do you agree or object?” Canon Barron replied, “I object and I object to say anything to you at all.” Mr. Potter then said, “In my capacity as chairman I give my casting vote in their favour and declare them duly elected.” He continued to walk with Canon Barron a few steps and then said, “That is all I want to say; thank you. Good day.”

There followed a general meeting at which new directors were again said to be appointed, again with Canon Barron's objection. Canon Barron sought a declaration that the appointment of the directors were ineffective, arguing that the meeting on the train station was no meeting, and that the general meeting's resolution was invalid, since the board was the only organ that could appoint more directors.

== Judgment ==
Warrington J held that in view of the deadlock, the power reverted to the general meeting. In this case, the appointments were valid. There had been no proper board meeting on the train platform, but the shareholder meeting was effective afterwards.

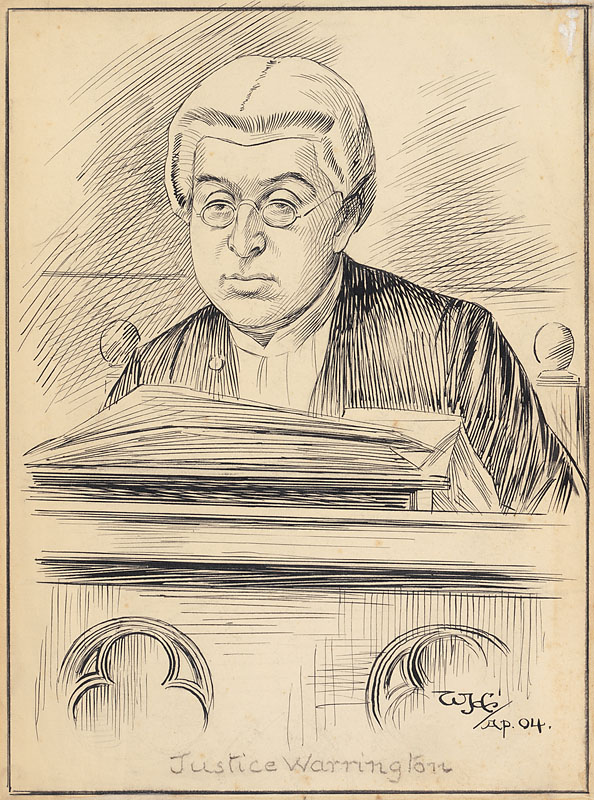
Thomas Warrington, 1st Baron Warrington of Clyffe.

The question then arises, Was the resolution passed at the general meeting of the company a valid appointment? The argument against the validity of the appointment is that the articles of association of the company gave to the board of directors the power of appointing additional directors, that the company has accordingly surrendered the power, and that the directors alone can exercise it. It is true that the general point was so decided by Eve J in Blair Open Hearth Furnace Co v Reigart, and I am not concerned to say that in ordinary cases where there is a board ready and willing to act it would be competent for the company to override the power conferred on the directors by the articles except by way of special resolution for the purpose of altering the articles. But the case which I have to deal with is a different one. For practical purposes there is no board of directors at all. The only directors are two persons, one of whom refuses to act with the other, and the question is, What is to be done under these circumstances? On this point I think that I can usefully refer to the judgment of the Court of Appeal in Isle of Wight Ry Co v Tahourdin, not for the sake of the decision, which depended on the fact that it was a case under the Companies Clauses Consolidation Act 1845, but for the sake of the observations of Cotton and Fry LJJ upon the effect of a deadlock such as arose in the present case. Cotton LJ says:

“Then it is said that there is no power in the meeting of shareholders to elect new directors, for that under the 89th section the power would be in the remaining directors. The remaining directors would no doubt have that power if there was a quorum left. But suppose the meeting were to remove so many directors that a quorum was not left, what then follows? It has been argued that in that case, there being no board which could act, there would be no power of filling up the board so as to enable it to work. In my opinion that is utterly wrong. A power is given by the 89th section to the remaining directors ‘if they think proper so to do’ to elect persons to fill up the vacancies. I do not see how it is possible for a non-existent body to think proper to fill up vacancies. In such a case a general meeting duly summoned for the purpose must have power to elect a new board so as not to let the business of the company be at a deadlock.”

Fry LJ says this:

“Then with regard to the objection that a general meeting cannot elect directors to fill up vacancies, it appears to me that a general meeting would at any rate have that power in the event of all the directors being removed. In my judgment it is quite impossible to read the 89th section as the only section relating to the filling up of vacancies in the office of directors. That applies only where there are remaining directors, and those remaining directors think proper to exercise their power. That does not, in my judgment, deprive the general meeting of the power to elect directors, where there are no directors, or where the directors do not think fit to exercise their powers.”

Those observations express a principle which seems to me to be as applicable to the case of a limited company incorporated under the Companies (Consolidation) Act 1908, as to a case falling under the Companies Clauses Consolidation Act 1845, and moreover to be a principle founded on plain common sense. If directors having certain powers are unable or unwilling to exercise them—are in fact a non-existent body for the purpose—there must be some power in the company to do itself that which under other circumstances would be otherwise done. The directors in the present case being unwilling to appoint additional directors under the power conferred on them by the articles, in my opinion, the company in general meeting has power to make the appointment. The company has passed a resolution for that purpose, and though a poll has been demanded no date or place has yet been fixed for taking it. The result therefore is that I must grant an injunction on the motion in Canon Barron's action and refuse the motion in Mr. Potter's action.

Another case [1915] 3 KB 593 followed, with Atkin J in the High Court, and Warrington LJ again in the Court of Appeal.

== See also ==
- John Shaw & Sons (Salford) Ltd v Shaw [1935] 2 KB 113
