= Richard Atkin, Baron Atkin =

Judge in England and Wales

The Right Honourable The Lord Atkin PC, FBA

Lord of Appeal in Ordinary
- In office 6 February 1928 – 25 June 1944
- Preceded by: The Lord Atkinson
- Succeeded by: The Lord Goddard

Lord Justice of Appeal
- In office 7 March 1919 – 6 February 1928
- Preceded by: Sir William Pickford
- Succeeded by: Sir John Sankey

Judge of the High Court
- In office 30 May 1913 – 7 March 1919
- Preceded by: None
- Succeeded by: Sir Arthur Greer

Personal details
- Born: James Richard Atkin; 28 November 1867 Brisbane, Queensland
- Died: 25 June 1944 (aged 76) Aberdyfi, Wales
- Spouse: Lucy Elizabeth (Lizzie) Hemmant (1867–1939)
- Children: 6 daughters, 2 sons
- Education: Magdalen College, Oxford

James Richard Atkin, Baron Atkin, PC, FBA (28 November 1867 – 25 June 1944), known from 1913 to 1928 as Sir Richard Atkin and also called Dick Atkin, was an Australian-British barrister who served as a judge of the King's Bench division of the High Court of Justice, a justice of the Court of Appeal, and finally as a lord of appeal in ordinary from 1928 until his death in 1944. He is especially remembered as the judge who gave the leading judgement in the 1932 case Donoghue v Stevenson, which established the modern law of negligence in the UK and indirectly in most of the common law world.

== Early life ==
James Richard Atkin was born on 28 November 1867 to Robert Travers Atkin and Mary Elizabeth (née Ruck). Robert was from Kilgarriff, County Cork, Mary's father from Newington, Kent, and her mother from Merioneth, Wales. The couple married in 1864 and soon emigrated to Australia intending to take up sheep farming. However, little more than a year into their enterprise Robert was badly injured in a fall from a horse and the couple moved to Brisbane where Robert became a journalist and politician.

Atkin was born at Ellandale cottage, Tank Street, off North Quay, Brisbane, the eldest of three sons. In 1871, his mother brought him and his brothers back to her own mother's house, "Pantlludw" on the River Dovey in Wales. His father died in Brisbane in the following year. Atkin was much influenced by his grandmother and acquired from her an egalitarian instinct and a distaste for sanctimonious posturing. His mother's sister, Amy, was the first wife of Francis Darwin, third son of Charles Darwin (1809–1882) and his wife Emma: there is a thank-you letter extant to Charles Darwin from the eleven-year-old Atkin.

Atkin attended Friars School, Bangor, and Christ College, Brecon, and won a demyship to Magdalen College, Oxford, where he read classics and literae humaniores, enjoying playing tennis in his leisure time. Atkin always thought of himself as a Welshman, and was President of the London Welsh Trust from 1938 to 1944.

== Advocate ==
Atkin was called to the bar from Gray's Inn in 1891 and scoured the London law courts assessing the quality of the advocates so as to decide where to apply for pupillage. He was ultimately impressed by Thomas Scrutton and became his pupil, joining fellow pupils Frank MacKinnon, a future Lord Justice of Appeal, and Robert Wright, another future Law Lord. He took chambers at 3 Pump Court but, as did most beginning barristers at the time, struggled to find work. He shared living accommodation with Arthur Hughes, who later married Mary Vivian Hughes whose book A London Family 1870–1900 mentions Atkin. He eventually established a practice in commercial law, in particular in work on behalf of the London Stock Exchange, and became known as a subtle advocate with no need to rely on theatrical effects. His practice grew from about 1900, and he made a favourable impression when appearing before the future prime minister H. H. Asquith who was sitting as an arbitrator. Asquith was so impressed that he secured a pupillage for his own son Raymond at Atkin's chambers. By 1906, The Times considered Atkin probably the busiest junior at the Bar. In that year, Atkin took silk. Once John Hamilton was made a judge in 1909 and Scrutton in 1910, Atkin dominated the commercial Bar.

== Judge ==
Atkin was appointed as a judge of the King's Bench Division of the High Court of England and Wales in 1913, receiving a knighthood. Work at the King's Bench involved him in criminal cases, which had been outside his experience as an advocate, but he established a high reputation as a criminal judge. Reputedly, Atkin enjoyed his six years at the King's Bench more than any others of his legal career. The following nine at the Court of Appeal he enjoyed the least.

Atkin became a Lord Justice of Appeal in 1919. In the 1920 case of Meering v Graham-White Aviation Co Ltd Atkin showed his disapproval of unjustified restriction on civil liberties by holding (obiter) that a person could sue for false imprisonment even under circumstances where he had been unaware of his imprisonment at the time. Again in 1920, in Everett v Griffiths, Atkin held that Everett was owed a duty of care by a Board of Guardians who had detained him as insane on inadequate grounds. However, Lord Justices Scrutton and Bankes held otherwise and their majority prevailed over Atkin's dissenting judgment.

From 1928 until his death he was a Lord of Appeal in Ordinary under the title Baron Atkin of Aberdovey, in the County of Merioneth.

An Anglican, Atkin was strongly motivated by his Christian faith and relied on testing the law against the demands of common sense and the interests of the ordinary working man. He came to a settled view early on in hearing a case and, as a Law Lord, his colleagues often found him indefatigable in his opinions and difficult to persuade as to the merits of alternative views.

=== Donoghue v Stevenson ===
In 1932, as a member of the House of Lords, he delivered the leading judgment in the landmark case of Donoghue v Stevenson concerning the alleged adverse effects from an alleged snail in a bottle of ginger beer served in a café in Paisley. The case established the modern law of negligence in the UK and, indirectly, in most of the rest of the common law world, with the major exception of the United States.

=== Liversidge v. Anderson ===
He is also remembered for his dissenting judgment in Liversidge v Anderson, in which he unsuccessfully asserted the courts' right to question the wide discretionary powers of the Home Secretary to detain subjects suspected of having 'hostile associations'.

=== Commercial law ===
He also gave the leading judgment in Bell v. Lever Brothers Ltd., as of 2012, still the leading authority on common mistake under English law.

== Gray's Inn ==
The Inn had been at a low ebb when Atkin joined. It was impoverished, its dinners and functions poorly attended and its benchers lacking professional prestige. It was largely through Atkin's efforts, and those of F.E. Smith, that the Inn's prestige was restored. Atkin was himself three times Treasurer, Master of the Library and Master of Moots.

== Personal life ==
In 1888, Atkin was engaged to be married to Lucy Elizabeth (Lizzie) Hemmant (1867–1939), the daughter of William Hemmant, a friend of Atkin's father from Brisbane. She had been born within 12 days and within 100 yards (91 m) of Atkin's birthplace. William Hemmant later moved to London and was important in helping Atkin to establish his stock exchange contacts. Atkin and Lizzie Hemmant were married in 1893, after a five year engagement.

The couple had six daughters and two sons, the elder son being killed in the First World War. Their daughter Rosaline also became a barrister from Gray's Inn. To her father's delight, their fourth daughter, Nancy, became an actress. She made her stage debut in Liverpool and was discovered and brought to London by Charles Hawtrey and A. A. Milne. Atkin's grandson, by his daughter Lucy Atkin, was the politician and business leader Toby Low, 1st Baron Aldington.

Atkin enjoyed the music hall and in particular the humour of George Robey and Marie Lloyd. He and his wife were fond of entertaining friends with musical evenings at their succession of town houses in Kensington. In 1912, Atkin realised his ambition to buy a house in Aberdovey, Craig-y-Don, and from that time spent every summer there with his family. At Aberdovey, he enjoyed tennis, golf, and bridge. He was popular with the community in Aberdovey and was paraded into the village on a hand-drawn cab on his appointment to the High Court in 1913. When possible, he sat as a Justice of the Peace in Towyn and Machynlleth, and eventually chaired the Merionethshire Quarter Sessions. Atkin was President of the London Welsh Trust, which runs the London Welsh Centre, in Gray's Inn Road, from 1938 until 1944.

He died of bronchitis in Aberdyfi, where he was buried.

== Honours ==
- Honorary fellowship of Magdalen College, Oxford (1924);
- Fellow of the British Academy (1938);
- Foreign Honorary Member of the American Academy of Arts and Sciences (1939);
- Honorary degrees:
  - University of Oxford (1931);
  - University of Cambridge (1936);
  - University of Reading (1938); and
  - University of London (1939).

A plaque was erected in 2012 at the Harry Gibbs Commonwealth Law Courts Building – built upon the land where Ellandale cottage once stood – commemorating the birthplace of Lord Atkin, placed on the 145th anniversary of his birth and the 80th anniversary of his judgement Donoghue v Stevenson. It was arranged by the TC Beirne School of Law, University of Queensland and the Federal Court of Australia.

== Cases ==
High Court

- Barron v Potter [1915] 3 KB 593, small company deadlock

Court of Appeal

- Balfour v Balfour [1919] 2 KB 571
- Meering v Graham-White Aviation Co Ltd (1920) 122 LT 44
- Everett v Griffiths [1920] 3 KB 163
- Rose & Frank Co v JR Crompton & Bros Ltd [1923] 2 KB 261, intention to create legal relations in commerce
- R v Secretary of State for Home Affairs ex parte O'Brien [1923] 2 KB 361, internment of Irish nationalists
- Russian Commercial and Industrial Bank v Comptoir d'Estcompte de Mulhouse [1923] 2 KB 630, compensation for nationalisation by Russia of banks
- Rowland v Divall [1923] 2 KB 500, failure of consideration
- National Provincial Bank v Charnley [1924] 1 KB 431, meaning of a security interest
- Glassbrook Bros v Glamorgan County Council [1925] AC 270, dissenting in the Court of Appeal, liability of employer to pay for police protection
- Tournier v National Provincial and Union Bank of England [1924] 1 KB 461

House of Lords and Privy Council

- France v James Coombes & Co [1929] AC 496, definition of employee and inequality of bargaining power under section 8 of the Trade Boards Act 1909
- Bell v Lever Brothers Ltd [1932] AC 161, common mistake
- Donoghue v Stevenson [1932] AC 562, negligence
- Maritime National Fish Ltd v Ocean Trawlers Ltd [1935] UKPC 1, frustration
- Woolmington v DPP [1935] UKHL 1, presumption of innocence
- Hillen and Pettigrew v ICI (Alkali) Ltd [1936] AC 65, causes of action, trespass, negligence
- Way v Latilla [1937] 3 All ER 759
- Wilsons and Clyde Coal Ltd v English [1937] UKHL 2
- Labour Conventions Reference [1937] AC 326, Canadian federalism
- Reference re Alberta Statutes [1938] UKPC 46, striking down Alberta laws on social credit
- Vita Food Products Inc v Unus Shipping Co Ltd [1939] UKPC 7
- Nokes v Doncaster Amalgamated Collieries Ltd [1940] AC 1014, no transfer of employment contract without the employee's consent
- Southern Foundries (1926) Ltd v Shirlaw [1940] AC 701, implied terms
- United Australia Ltd v Barclays Bank Ltd [1941] AC 1, administrative law
- Fibrosa Spolka Akcyjna v Fairbairn Lawson Combe Barbour Ltd [1942] UKHL 4, frustration and failure of consideration
- Liversidge v Anderson [1942] AC 206

== Notes ==
Secondary sources

- J.R. Atkin (1922). "Law for laymen". John O'London's Weekly.
- Atkin, J.R. (1922). "When witnesses fail". The Detective Magazine.
- Atkin, J.R. (1929). Appeals in English Law.
- Harding, R.W. (1964). "Lord Atkin's judicial attitudes and their illustration in commercial law and contract". Modern Law Review. 27 (4): 434–446. doi:10.1111/j.1468-2230.1964.tb01038.x.
- G. Lewis (1983). Lord Atkin. London: Butterworths. ISBN 1-84113-057-5.
- Lewis, Geoffrey (2004). "Atkin, James Richard, Baron Atkin (1867–1944)". Oxford Dictionary of National Biography. Oxford: Oxford University Press. doi:10.1093/ref:odnb/30492. (subscription, Wikipedia Library access or UK public library membership required)
