= National Provincial Bank v Charnley =

British insolvency law case

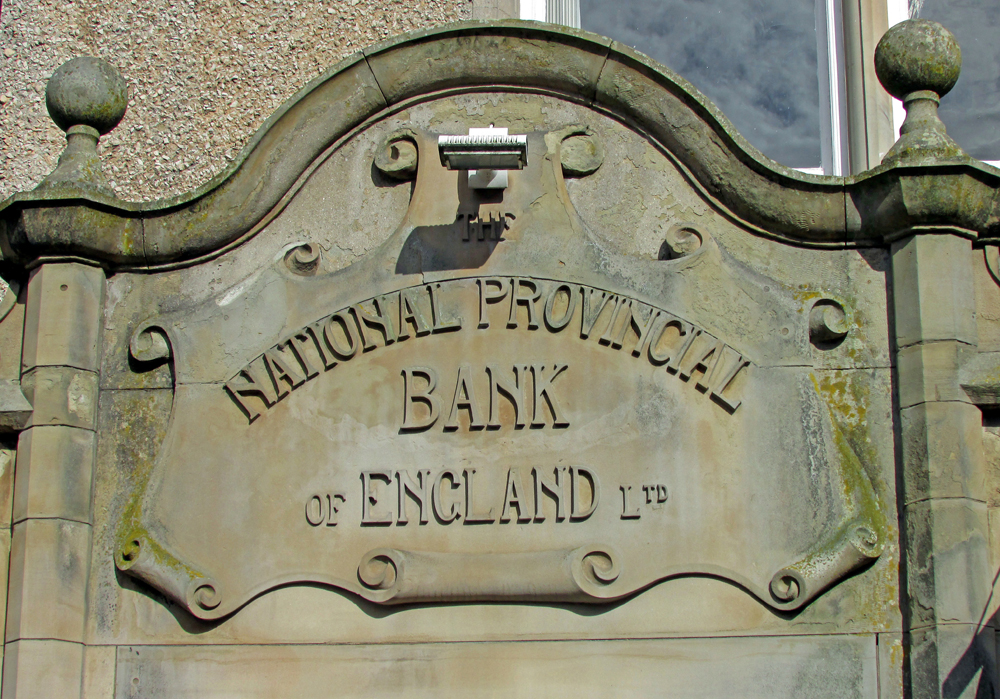
- Court: Court of Appeal
- Citation: [1924] 1 KB 431

Keywords
- Security interest, debenture

National Provincial Bank v Charnley [1924] 1 KB 431 is a UK insolvency law case, concerning the taking of a security interest over a company's assets and priority of creditors in a company winding up.

== Facts ==
Two creditors of the Fylde Bacon Curing Co were in dispute over who could seize the company’s property. The National Provincial Bank had a contract on 16 July 1921 that said it had a lease ‘demised’ for 996 years over ‘plant used in or about the premises’ in return for a loan. Charnley, an unsecured creditor who had already got judgment, argued that this did not include some company vans, because the word ‘demise’ suggested things concerning land. The bank claimed the vans should belong to it, because its charge was first, and its charge was duly registered under the Companies Act 1908, section 93 (now Companies Act 2006, s 860).

== Judgment ==
The Court of Appeal held, Bankes LJ and Scrutton LJ giving the first two judgments, that the substance of the documents was that a charge was to be created, and the charge had been properly registered. Atkin LJ concurred and started his judgment with an outline of what a charge was. It being a matter of the parties’ intentions, a charge had been created.

The first question that arises is whether or not this document does create a mortgage or charge, and to determine that it is necessary to form an idea of what is meant by a “charge”. It is not necessary to give a formal definition of a charge, but I think there can be no doubt that where in a transaction for value both parties evince an intention that property, existing or future, shall be made available as security for the payment of a debt, and that the creditor shall have a present right to have it made available, there is a charge, even though the present legal right which is contemplated can only be enforced at some future date, and though the creditor gets no legal right of property, either absolute or special, or any legal right to possession, but only gets a right to have the security made available by an order of the Court. If those conditions exist I think there is a charge. If, on the other hand, the parties do not intend that there should be a present right to have the security made available, but only that there should be a right in the future by agreement, such as a licence, to seize the goods, there will be no charge.

== See also ==
- UK insolvency law
