= John Shaw & Sons (Salford) Ltd v Shaw =

UK company law case in 1935

- Court: Court of Appeal
- Full case name: John Shaw & Sons (Salford) Ltd v Peter Shaw and John Shaw
- Decided: 1 March 1935
- Citation: [1935] 2 KB 113

Court membership
- Judges sitting: Greer LJ; Roche LJ; Slesser LJ

John Shaw & Sons (Salford) Ltd v Shaw [1935] 2 KB 113 is a UK company law case, concerning the proper interpretation of a company's articles of association.

== Facts ==
Peter, John and Percy Shaw had a company together. They had an argument over owing the company money, and the result was a settlement. Peter and John would resign as governing directors, promised they would not take part in financial affairs, and independent directors would be appointed and given control over the company's financial affairs. When the independent directors required John and Peter to pay money to the company, John and Peter refused. The independent directors resolved to bring a claim against them. Just before the hearing, an extraordinary general meeting was called, where as the majority shareholders Peter and John procured a resolution to discontinue the litigation. The company, and Percy, contended the resolution was ineffective.

At first instance Du Parcq J disregarded the resolution and gave judgment for the company. John appealed.

== Judgment ==
The Court of Appeal upheld the judge, so that the shareholders could not circumvent the company's constitution and order the directors to discontinue litigation. Greer LJ said the following.

I am therefore of opinion that the learned judge was right in refusing to dismiss the action on the plea that it was commenced without the authority of the plaintiff company. I think the judge was also right in refusing to give effect to the resolution of the meeting of the shareholders requiring the chairman to instruct the company's solicitors not to proceed further with the action. A company is an entity distinct alike from its shareholders and its directors. Some of its powers may, according to its articles, be exercised by directors, certain other powers may be reserved for the shareholders in general meeting. If powers of management are vested in the directors, they and they alone can exercise these powers. The only way in which the general body of the shareholders can control the exercise of the powers vested by the articles in the directors is by altering their articles, or, if opportunity arises under the articles, by refusing to re-elect the directors of whose actions they disapprove. They cannot themselves usurp the powers which by the articles are vested in the directors any more than the directors can usurp the powers vested by the articles in the general body of shareholders. The law on this subject is, I think, accurately stated in Buckley on Companies as the effect of the decisions there mentioned: see 11th ed., p. 723. For these reasons I am of opinion that the Court ought not to dismiss the action on the ground that it was instituted and carried on without the authority of the plaintiff company.

Roche LJ and Slesser LJ agreed, although for slightly differing reasons.

== See also ==
- UK company law
- Russian Commercial and Industrial Bank v Comptoir d'Estcompte de Mulhouse [1923] 2 KB 630
