= Ben Greene =

British politician (1901–1978)

Ben Greene (28 December 1901 – October 1978) was a British Labour Party politician and pacifist. He was interned during the Second World War because of his fascist associations and appealed to the Judicial Committee of the House of Lords against his detention. In the leading case of Liversidge v. Anderson, the Law Lords declined to interfere with ministerial discretion on matters of national security and thus refused to review his detention.

== Early life ==
Greene was born in Brazil to a mother who had been born a German national, but moved with his family to England as a child in 1908. He attended Berkhamsted School, where his uncle, Charles Greene, was headmaster and where his cousins, Graham Greene and Hugh Greene, were also pupils. He went up to Wadham College, Oxford, but became committed to the causes of the Labour Party and the Society of Friends (Quakers), and left without graduating. Until 1923, he worked with the Society of Friends, the Save the Children Fund and the American Relief Administration in humanitarian work in Eastern Europe.

Greene was motivated to get involved in politics almost solely by his belief in pacifism. He returned to London and during the 1923 United Kingdom general election he worked for Clement Attlee in the Limehouse constituency, where he met John Beckett. In 1924, Greene joined the Independent Labour Party (ILP) and soon became its liaison with Ramsay MacDonald. He fought Basingstoke in the 1924 United Kingdom general election, but without success. He often felt that Labour Party policies were at odds with his pacifism.

Greene got married in 1925 and became a businessman, in England and abroad, while serving on Berkhamsted Urban District Council and on Hertfordshire County Council, and becoming a Justice of the Peace (JP) in 1937. He unsuccessfully contested Gravesend against Irving Albery in 1931 and 1935. He also continued with human rights work in the Saar and Germany. By 1938, he had become disillusioned with the Labour Party, perceiving it as being in the grip of Communists, and resigned from it.

== Fascist friends ==
Shocked by conditions in Germany, Greene formed the idea that Britain should co-operate with Nazi officials in order to facilitate the emigration of as many threatened Germans as possible. However, he fell under the influence of an English-born Nazi diplomat, Ernst Wilhelm Bohle, who was all too ready to exploit his naivety. Greene briefly joined the Peace Pledge Union, and started the Peace and Progress Information Service (PPIS) to publish information provided to him by Bohle. Greene tried to connect with anyone who was opposed to war, including fascists, and later joined the British People's Party (BPP), becoming its treasurer.

In December 1939, Greene ghosted The Truth About the War for the BPP. Attlee saw a copy and was shocked by its "pro-Hitler" tone and its claims that the Poles had been the authors of their own misfortunes. Greene was a frequent speaker at anti-war meetings, and spoke of the "danger of Jewish and American capitalists".

== Detention ==
In early 1940, Lord Hampden, in his capacity as Lord Lieutenant of Hertfordshire, approached Maxwell Knight of MI5 and questioned Greene's suitability as a JP. Knight felt that he had no evidence on which to seek the removal of Greene from the post. At the same time, Vernon Kell was calling for action against the BPP, in particular for Greene and Beckett's internment under Defence Regulation 18B.

The order to detain Greene because of his "hostile associations" was signed on 22 May 1940, and Greene was arrested on 24 May. The "Reasons for Order" cited Greene's membership of the BPP and the British Council for Christian Settlement in Europe, the content of his speeches, his association with Beckett, and his communications with the German government. It also alleged that he desired to establish a National Socialist regime with the assistance of the German Army and had harboured German agents. The more specific "Statement of Case" revealed that these allegations had been made by Harold Kurtz.

Kurtz was an MI5 agent who posed as a National Socialist German agent recently released from internment in Britain. Kurtz entrapped Greene with another MI5 agent, Gaertner, as a witness, and alleged that Greene had helped him to avoid further internment and clandestinely communicate with Germany, and had told him ways of leaving the country undetected. Kurtz also claimed that Greene had told him that there were "men in this country ready to take over the government after a German victory, men trained in and filled with the proper spirit of National Socialism—a British National Socialism".

Greene denied these allegations and claimed that he had reported Kurtz's suspicious behaviour to the police. The police denied Greene's claim.

== First hearing of the Advisory Committee ==
Greene challenged his detention at the Advisory Committee headed by A. T. Miller on 24 July. Though the committee was eager to hear from the MI5 agents who had provided statements, MI5 refused to allow them to attend, and the committee accepted the statements as "substantially accurate". Greene's detention was confirmed.

The Lord Chancellor's Department was advised, and Greene was informed on 10 October of the intention to remove him as a JP, though he was offered the face-saving alternative of resignation. Greene was removed as a JP on 8 November.

== Greene's appeal ==
Greene's brother Edward sought legal advice from Oswald Hickson, who had been active in internment cases from a liberal rather than a fascist standpoint. Hickson wrote to the Advisory Committee to protest that the "Reasons for Order" gave no particulars of the persons who had made the allegations against Greene. The committee spurned Hickson's approach, so he applied for a writ of habeas corpus. The application was heard by a divisional court on 21 May 1941. Greene represented himself. The court dismissed Greene's application, but expressed concern about the technical errors in the drafting of the detention order and criticised the Home Secretary. It also suggested a rehearing of Greene's case.

Greene then petitioned the Court of Appeal to have the ruling overturned while the Home Office reissued the order and the "Reasons for Order", naming Kurtz and Gaertner as the sources of the allegations. The appeal was heard by Lords Justice of Appeal Scott, MacKinnon and Goddard on 15 to 16 July. They rejected it on 30 July. Scott delivered the judgment of the court. The court ruled that it was not able to question the discretion of the Home Secretary, honestly exercised.

Greene then appealed to the Judicial Committee of the House of Lords, and his case was joined with that of another detainee, Robert Liversidge. The case was heard as Liversidge v. Anderson, and the decision of the Court of Appeal was upheld on 3 November.

== Second hearing of the Advisory Committee ==
A second hearing by the Advisory Committee was convened in November. The committee rejected Kurtz's allegations, as having been discredited, and accepted Greene's undertaking not to hinder the war effort and to avoid contact with Beckett and Hastings Russell, 12th Duke of Bedford. Greene's detention order was revoked on 9 January 1942.

== A remedy for Greene ==
Greene sued for damages for libel and for false imprisonment. The purported libel was in the "Reasons for Order", a document protected by privilege, and to succeed in his claim for false imprisonment, Greene would have to have proved that the Home Secretary made the detention order with no honest belief in the facts stated in it. Hickson withdrew the action before the final judgment and costs of £1,243 were awarded against Greene. Though proceedings were started to bankrupt Greene, these were never brought to court.

== Later life ==
Greene continued to be involved in right-wing politics. He left the BPP to form the English Nationalist Association.

== Bibliography ==
- Lewis, Jeremy (2010). Shades of Greene: One Generation of an English Family. Jonathan Cape.
- Simpson, A. W. B. (1992). In the Highest Degree Odious: Detention without Trial in Wartime Britain. Oxford: Oxford University Press. ISBN 0-19-825775-9.
- Greene, B. (2018). The British Constitution and the Corruption of Parliament. The A.K. Chesterton Trust. ISBN 978-0-99-328858-6.
