= Royal Commission on the Private Manufacture of and Trading in Arms =

The Royal Commission on the Private Manufacture of and Trading in Arms was a British official inquiry into the armaments industry. It was appointed on 20 February 1935 and was chaired by Sir John Bankes. Its report was published in October 1936.

The Commission sat for twenty two sessions and produced a unanimous report that advocated more state control over the armaments industry.

== See also ==
- Nye Committee
