= Herbert du Parcq, Baron du Parcq =

British judge (1880–1949)

The Right Honourable The Lord du Parcq PC
- Mr Justice du Parcq in 1932, by Walter Stoneman

Lord of Appeal in Ordinary
- In office 5 February 1946 – 27 April 1949
- Preceded by: The Lord Goddard
- Succeeded by: The Lord Greene; The Viscount Radcliffe

Lord Justice of Appeal
- In office 24 October 1938 – 5 February 1946
- Preceded by: Sir Arthur Greer

Justice of the High Court
- In office 22 February 1932 – 24 October 1938

Personal details
- Born: Herbert du Parcq; 5 August 1880 Saint Helier, Jersey
- Died: 27 April 1949 (aged 68) London, England
- Education: Exeter College, Oxford; Jesus College, Oxford

Herbert du Parcq, Baron du Parcq, PC (5 August 1880 – 27 April 1949) was a British judge, who served as a law lord between 1946 and 1949.

== Early life ==
Du Parcq was born in Saint Helier, Jersey in 1880, son of Clement Pixley du Parcq and Sophia Thoreau. He was distantly connected to Henry David Thoreau through his mother. He was educated at Victoria College, Jersey and Exeter College, Oxford (BA Literae Humaniores) (2nd class) and Jesus College, Oxford (BCL, senior scholar). He was president of the Oxford Union in 1902. He was called to the Bar by Middle Temple in 1906 and admitted to the Jersey Bar in the same year.

== Career ==
He became a specialist in commercial litigation in London, was appointed a King's Counsel in 1926 and was appointed Recorder for Portsmouth in 1928 and Recorder for Bristol in 1929. A mutiny in Dartmoor Prison on 24 January 1932 led to the setting up of a commission of enquiry under du Parcq. His report was considered satisfactory and he was rewarded with an appointment to the King's Bench Division as a judge, receiving the customary knighthood.

Appointed to the Privy Council in 1938, du Parcq was Lord Justice of Appeal from 1938 to 1946. On 5 February 1946, he was appointed Lord of Appeal in Ordinary and was created a life peer with the title Baron du Parcq, of Grouville in the Island of Jersey.

During World War II, he chaired the Channel Islands Refugees Committee which raised funds, gave financial relief, distributed clothing, traced relatives and gave guidance and help to refugees. The UK government relied on the Committee for information on the Channel Islands and in September 1940 his first appeal for funds on the BBC's 'The Week's Good Cause' programme raised what was then a record result.

In 1946 he became chairman of a Royal Commission into justices of the peace. He was a member of the Permanent Court of Arbitration at The Hague, and was an Honorary Fellow of Exeter College and Jesus College.

Du Parcq was also the author of a four-volume biography of David Lloyd George, published between 1911 and 1913, though for unknown reasons he avoided referring to it later in his life.

Du Parcq died in a London nursing home on 27 April 1949.

== Notable trials ==
- Prosecution of the murder of Alice Thomas and others by Annie Hearn in June 1931.

== Family ==
In 1911 he married Lucy Renouf, from St Helier. They had two daughters, Helen and Catherine, and a son, John Renouf.
