= Foley v Hill =

British legal case

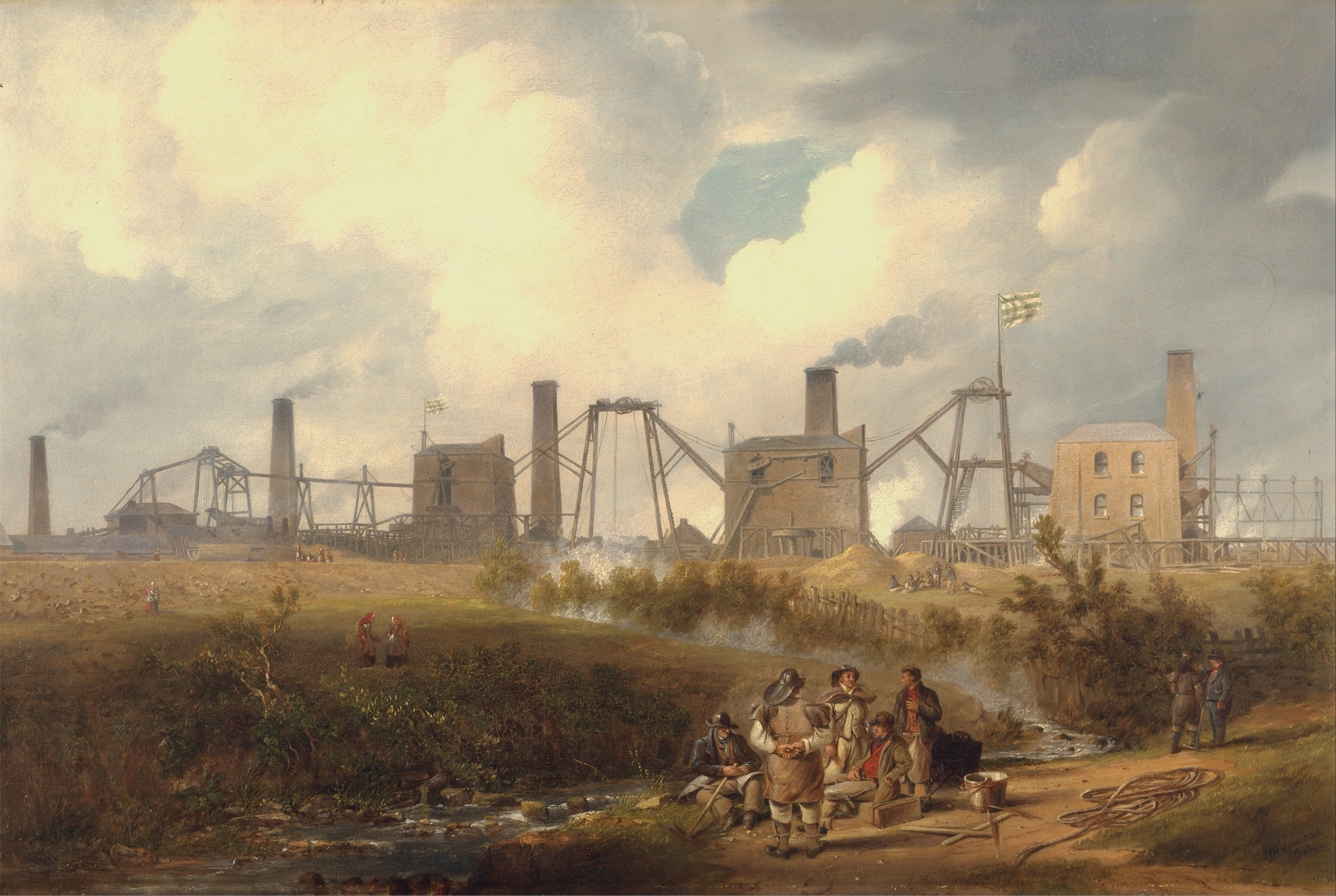
- A British colliery
- Court: House of Lords
- Full case name: Edward Thomas Foley v Thomas Hill and Others
- Decided: 1 August 1848
- Citations: (1848) 2 HLC 28; 9 ER 1002 [1843-60] All ER Rep 16
- Transcripts: United Settlement transcript CommonLII transcript

Case history
- Appealed from: Foley v Hill 1 Phil 399

Court membership
- Judges sitting: Lord Cottenham LC, Lord Lyndhurst, Lord Campbell

Keywords
- Bank account, limitation periods

Foley v Hill (1848) 2 HLC 28, 9 ER 1002 is a judicial decision of the House of Lords in relation to the fundamental nature of a bank account. Together with Joachimson v Swiss Bank Corporation [1921] 3 KB 110 it forms part of the foundational cases relating to English banking law and the nature of a bank's relationship with its customer in relation to the account.

The case decided that a banker does not hold the sums in a bank account on trust for its customer. Instead the relationship between them is that of debtor and creditor. When the customer deposits money in the account it becomes the bank's money, and the bank's obligation to repay an equivalent sum (and any agreed interest) to the customer or the customer's order.

The decision was crucial to the modern evolution of banking. Had the appellant's argument that the bank should be treated as a trustee succeeded then a bank would not be entitled to use the sums deposited with it for lending to other parties because of the rule against trustee's making a profit out of the trust property.

== Facts ==
Edward Thomas Foley and Sir Edward Scott (who was not a party to the action) were owners of collieries in Staffordshire. They had jointly opened an account with the defendant bank. In April 1829 £6,117 10s was transferred from that joint account to a separate account in the sole name of Foley. The bank sent a letter enclosing the receipt and agreeing to pay 3 per cent interest on the sum. From 1829 until 1834, when the joint account was closed, Foley's share of the profits of the collieries was paid by cheques drawn on the joint account by the agents managing the collieries. These cheques were paid in cash or by bills drawn by them on their London bankers in favour of Foley, and none of them were paid into his separate account. The only amount ever credited to that account was the initial £6,117 10s together with interest calculated by the bank up to 25 December 1831, but not afterwards.

Foley filed a bill in equity in January 1838 against the banking, claiming that an account should be taken of not only the initial deposit but also all other sums received by the bank for Foley on his private account since April 1829, with interest on the same at the rate of 3 per cent per annum; and also an account of all sums properly paid by them for or to the use of Foley on his said account since that day.

The defendant banks pleaded a defence based upon the Statute of Limitations.

== Judgment ==
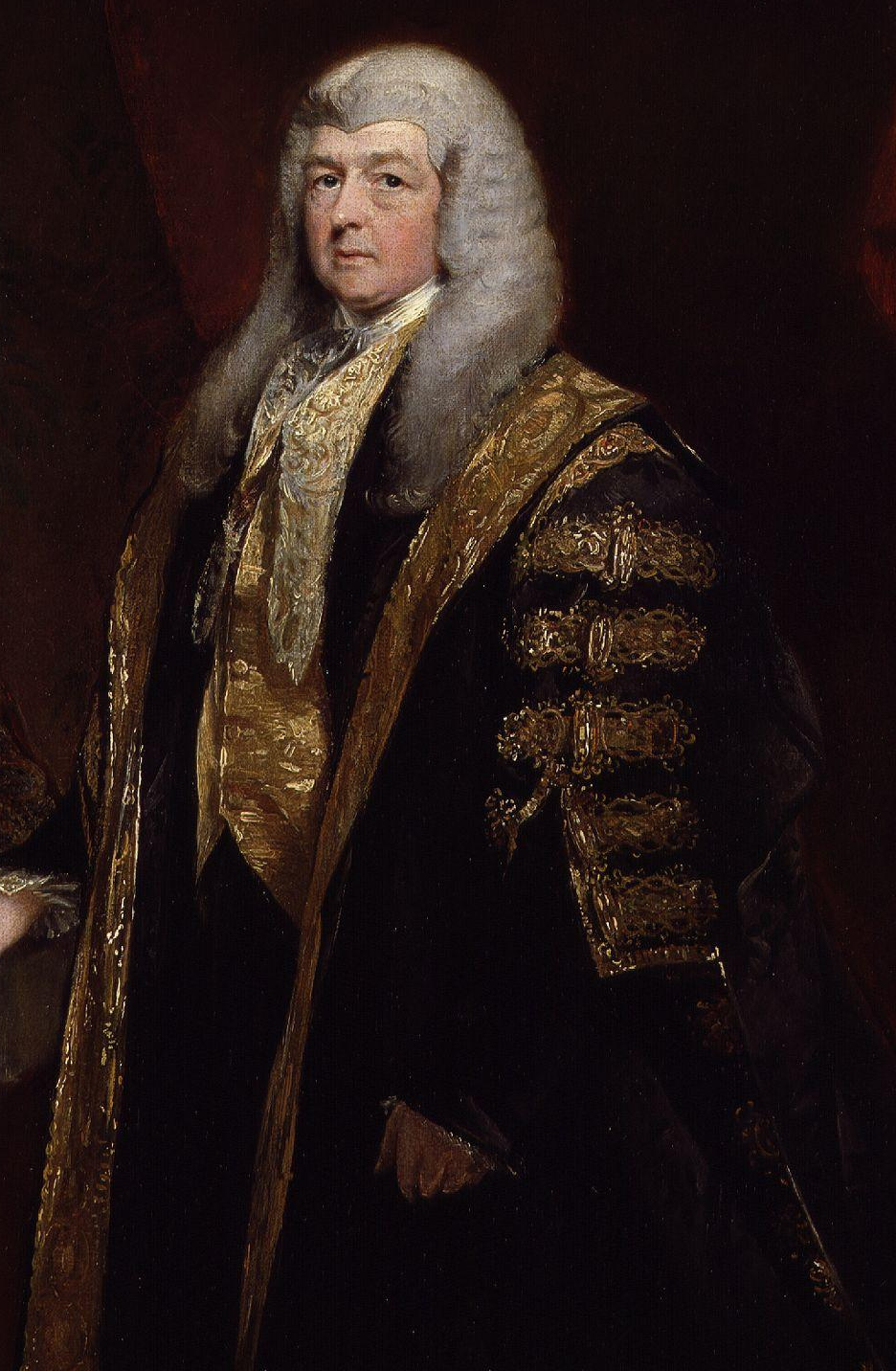
Lord Cottenham LC

The case came initially before the Vice-Chancellor, Sir James Wigram, who ordered an account. That decision was appealed to the Lord Chancellor, Lord Lyndhurst, who reversed the decision. The matter was then appealed to the House of Lords where, unusually, Lord Lyndhurst sat on the appeal against his own decision (although by this time he had been replaced by Lord Cottenham as Lord Chancellor). After hearing counsel for the appellant Foley, their Lordships told counsel for the bank that they did not need to address them and promptly dismissed the appeal.

=== House of Lords ===
The House of Lords held that because there was no equitable relationship the defence based upon limitation periods succeeded. Giving the main judgment, the Lord Cottenham LC said the following.

Money, when paid into a bank, ceases altogether to be the money of the principal; it is by then the money of the banker, who is bound to return an equivalent by paying a similar sum to that deposited with him when he is asked for it. The money paid into a banker’s is money known by the principal to be placed there for the purpose of being under the control of the banker; it is then the banker’s money; he is known to deal with it as his own; he makes what profit of it he can, which profit he retains to himself, paying back only the principal, according to the custom of bankers in some places, or the principal and a small rate of interest, according to the custom of bankers in other places. The money placed in custody of a banker is, to all intents and purposes, the money of the banker, to do with it as he pleases; he is guilty of no breach of trust in employing it; he is not answerable to the principal if he puts it into jeopardy, if he engages in a hazardous speculation; he is not bound to keep it or deal with it as the property of his principal; but he is, of course, answerable for the amount, because he has contracted, having received that money, to repay to the principal, when demanded, a sum equivalent to that paid into his hands. That has been the subject of discussion in various cases, and that has been established to be the relative situation of banker and customer. That being established to be the relative situations of banker and customer, the banker is not an agent or factor, but he is a debtor.

Lord Brougham, Lord Campbell and Lord Lyndhurst gave concurring opinions.

== Significance ==
The decision has been applied many times since, and has never been seriously questioned. Although various earlier cases had also applied the principle that the relationship between banker and customer was one of debtor and creditor, this was the first time that the House of Lords, as the highest court in the land, had affirmed the position.
