= R v Storrey =

- Supreme Court of Canada

Hearing: 3 November 1989 Judgment: 15 February 1990
- Full case name: Ronald Percy Storrey, Appellant v. Her Majesty The Queen, Respondent
- Citations: [1990] 1 S.C.R. 241
- Docket No.: 19725
- Prior history: on appeal from the Court of Appeal for Ontario
- Ruling: The appeal should be dismissed.

Court membership
- Chief Justice: Brian Dickson; Puisne Justices: Antonio Lamer, Bertha Wilson, Gérard La Forest, Claire L'Heureux-Dubé, John Sopinka, Charles Gonthier, Peter Cory, Beverley McLachlin

Reasons given
- Unanimous reasons by: Cory, J.

R v Storrey [1990] 1 S.C.R. 241 is a leading decision of the Supreme Court of Canada on the authority of police officers to make arrests. In addition to an officer's subjective belief that there are reasonable and probable grounds for arrest, the Court stipulated the grounds must be objectively justifiable.

In his judgement, Cory J. followed R v Brown (1987 NSCA) and Liversidge v Anderson in stating:

...the Criminal Code requires that an arresting officer must subjectively have reasonable and probable grounds on which to base the arrest. Those grounds must, in addition, be justifiable from an objective point of view. That is to say, a reasonable person placed in the position of the officer must be able to conclude that there were indeed reasonable and probable grounds for the arrest. On the other hand, the police need not demonstrate anything more than reasonable and probable grounds. Specifically, they are not required to establish a prima facie case for conviction before making the arrest.
