= Liversidge v Anderson =

English legal case on emergency powers of detention

- Court: House of Lords
- Decided: 3 November 1941
- Citations: [1941] UKHL 1, [1942] AC 206

Court membership
- Judges sitting: Viscount Maugham, Lord Atkin, Lord Macmillan, Lord Wright, Lord Romer

Keywords
- Judicial review, detention

Liversidge v Anderson [1942] AC 206 is a landmark United Kingdom administrative law case which concerned the relationship between the courts and the state, and in particular the assistance that the judiciary should give to the executive in times of national emergency. It concerns civil liberties and the separation of powers. Both the majority and dissenting judgments in the case have been cited as persuasive precedent by various countries of the Commonwealth of Nations. However, in England itself, the courts have gradually retreated from the decision in Liversidge. It has been described as "an example of extreme judicial deference to executive decision-making, best explained by the context of wartime, and it has no authority today." It is therefore mainly notable in England for the dissent of Lord Atkin.

== Facts ==
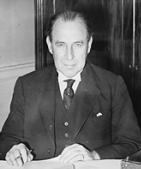
Defendant: Sir John Anderson, Home Secretary

Emergency powers in Regulation 18B of the Defence (General) Regulations 1939 permitted the Home Secretary to intern people if he had "reasonable cause" to believe that they had "hostile associations". Sir John Anderson exercised this power in respect of a man called Jack Perlzweig, who used the name Robert Liversidge, committing him to prison but giving no reason. On appeal, the case, joined with that of Ben Greene, reached the Appellate Committee of the House of Lords, the highest court of appeal. They had to decide whether the court could investigate the objective basis for the reasonable cause; in other words, could they evaluate the Home Secretary's actions on an objective standard, comparing them to that which might be taken by a reasonable man, or were they to measure them against the personal standard of the Secretary?

=== Detention Order ===
The text of the detention order was as follows:

Defence (General) Regulations, 1939. Detention Order.

Whereas I have reasonable cause to believe Jack Perlzweig alias Robert Liversidge to be a person of hostile associations and that by reason thereof it is necessary to exercise control over him:

Now, therefore, I, in pursuance of the power conferred on me by reg. 18B of the Defence (General) Regulations, 1939, hereby make the following Order:

I direct that the above-mentioned Jack Perlzweig alias Robert Liversidge be detained.

(Signed) John Anderson,
One of His Majesty's Principal Secretaries of State.

== Judgment ==
The majority of the Law Lords held that the legislation should be interpreted so as to effect what Parliament intended, even if that meant adding to the words to give that effect. Although Parliament had made the power subject to a reasonable belief they accepted the Home Secretary's statement that he held such a belief; in other words, that he believed he had reasonable cause. Viscount Maugham said that the court should "prefer a construction which will carry into effect the plain intention of those responsible" and Lord Macmillan that "it is right so to interpret emergency legislation as to promote rather than to defeat its efficacy". According to him, if the Secretary had acted in good faith, he need not disclose the basis for his decision, nor were his actions justiciable in a court of law.

The majority of the Lords appear to have been greatly concerned with the fact that they were dealing with a matter of national security. In their view, it was not appropriate for a court to deal with matters of national security, especially as they were not privy to classified information that only the executive had.

=== Dissent ===
In a dissenting speech Lord Atkin stated his view the majority had abdicated their responsibility to investigate and control the executive, and were being "more executive-minded than the executive". Atkin protested that theirs was "a strained construction put on words with the effect of giving an uncontrolled power of imprisonment to the minister", and went on to say:

In England, amidst the clash of arms, the laws are not silent. They may be changed, but they speak the same language in war as in peace. It has always been one of the pillars of freedom, one of the principles of liberty for which on recent authority we are now fighting, that the judges are no respecters of persons, and stand between the subject and any attempted encroachments on his liberty by the executive, alert to see that any coercive action is justified in law.

[...]

I know of only one authority which might justify the suggested method of construction. "When I use a word," Humpty Dumpty said, in rather a scornful tone, "it means just what I choose it to mean, neither more nor less." "The question is," said Alice, "whether you can make words mean so many different things." "The question is," said Humpty Dumpty, "which is to be the master, that's all." After all this long discussion the question is whether the words "If a man has" can mean "If a man thinks he has". I have an opinion that they cannot and the case should be decided accordingly.

Lord Atkin's view was that the phrase "reasonable cause" in the regulations indicated that the actions of the Secretary of State were meant to be evaluated by an objective standard. As a result, it would be within the court's purview to determine the reasonableness of those actions.

The potential power of this dissenting judgment was clearly recognised even before it was published. The Lord Chancellor, Viscount Simon, wrote to Lord Atkin asking him to amend the proposed terms of the speech. In what has been described as an example of great judicial courage, Atkin did not amend his speech. He was effectively ostracised by his judicial colleagues thereafter.

== Significance in the UK ==
Atkin's interpretation has generally been preferred in subsequent years. In Nakkuda Ali v Jayaratne a strong Privy Council held that Liversidge v. Anderson must not be taken to lay down any general rule on the construction of the expression "has reasonable cause to believe". Subsequently Liversidge v Anderson was described by Lord Reid in Ridge v Baldwin as a "very peculiar decision". Lord Diplock in I.R.C. v Rossminster Ltd thought that "the time has come to acknowledge openly that the majority of this House in Liversidge v Anderson were expediently and, at that time, perhaps, excusably, wrong and the dissenting speech of Lord Atkin was right".

However, in the 1977 deportation case of R v. Secretary of State ex parte Hosenball, Lord Denning MR, in the Court of Appeal, supported judicial non-interference with ministerial discretion in matters of national security.

The January 2010 judgment of the Supreme Court that occasioned the Terrorist Asset-Freezing (Temporary Provisions) Act 2010 and later the Terrorist Asset-Freezing etc. Act 2010 drew on Lord Atkin's dissent.

== Significance in the Commonwealth ==
Many Commonwealth jurisdictions have adopted approaches that accord with Lord Atkin's dissent. However, in Singapore and Malaysia, courts have generally followed the majority decision in Liversidge.

=== Australia ===
In Australia, the High Court has approved Lord Atkin's dissenting reasoning. In George v Rockett, decided in 1990, a unanimous Court stated that "[w]hen a statute prescribes that there must be 'reasonable grounds' for a state of mind – including suspicion and belief – it requires the existence of facts which are sufficient to induce that state of mind in a reasonable person". The Court went on to observe that "[t]hat was the point of Lord Atkin's famous, and now orthodox, dissent" in Liversidge. The approach articulated in George v Rockett has been repeatedly applied in later decisions of the High Court and by lower courts.

=== Bangladesh ===
The Liversidge decision was cited by the High Court of Bangladesh in its landmark judgement of Aruna Sen v. Government of Bangladesh, which set a precedent for invalidating most detentions under Bangladesh's Special Powers Act.

=== Canada ===
In R v Storrey, Cory J. wrote a unanimous Supreme Court of Canada verdict that outlined the peacetime conduct of arrest by Canadian police officers. He employed the language of Atkin, that, in addition to an officer's subjective belief that there are reasonable and probable grounds for arrest, the grounds must be justifiable from an objective point of view.

=== India ===
In India, the Liversidge decision was cited in Gopalan v. State of Madras, where the court held that the subjective test was to be applied. However, subsequent decisions such as Fazal Ghosi v. State of Uttar Pradesh have allowed some measure of judicial intervention by holding that the executive's decisions must be based on "pertinent material"; if it is found that there is no such material justifying the decision, the courts may act.

=== Malaysia ===
In Malaysia, the case which established the subjective test of reasonableness for executive actions was Karam Singh v. Menteri Hal Ehwal Dalam Negeri. The case, heard by the Federal Court in 1969, remains as binding precedent in Malaysia. In the case, the appellant had been detained under the Internal Security Act (ISA), but the statement of the Home Minister giving the grounds for his detention provided only one reason, even though his detention order had initially stated there were more. It was argued that the Home Minister had taken a "casual and cavalier" approach to the detention, and that because the allegations against the appellant had been unduly vague, the Home Minister had acted in bad faith, thereby voiding the detention. The court held that the detention was good, because it could not assess the actions of the executive, applying the subjective test of reasonableness as Liversidge had.

=== Pakistan ===
In Pakistan, in the case of Malik Ghulam Jillian V. Govt of West Pakistan, the Supreme Court of Pakistan reversed on appeal a judgement where the Court below had relied on the majority in Liversidge. The judges stated that it was late in the day to follow the dicta of the majority in Liversidge and that a Court had the power to review (following Atkin) the reasons provided on an objective basis.

=== Singapore ===
In Singapore, the case of Re Ong Yew Teck saw the arrest of a man under the Singaporean Criminal (Temporary Provisions) Ordinance 1955, which granted police officers the power to arrest and detain anyone "whom he has reason to believe that there is ground to justify his arrest and detention under s. 47" of the ordinance. The detainee appealed, arguing that the phrase "has reason to believe" meant that an objective test of reasonableness was to be used, citing Nakkuda Ali. Justice Chua rejected this argument, and accepted the majority decision in Liversidge as persuasive precedent.

=== West Indies ===
In Attorney-General of St. Christopher, Nevis and Anguilla v Reynolds, decided in 1979, the Privy Council referred to Lord Atkin's "celebrated dissenting speech" in Liversidge and Lord Reid's later description of the majority's conclusion as a "very peculiar decision", but found it unnecessary to express a concluded view on the relative merits of the majority reasons and the dissent.

The Privy Council did refer to a part of Lord Atkin's reasoning that "supports the argument that the words 'the Secretary of State is satisfied, etc.' may confer an absolute discretion upon the executive". The regulation in Reynolds stated that the Governor could order the detention of a person if he was "satisfied" that the person was involved in acts "prejudicial to the public safety, or to public order". However, the Privy Council held that Lord Atkin was not laying down a universal rule about the effect of the words "is satisfied". The Privy Council held that the regulation should be interpreted to require the Governor to form the required state of satisfaction "upon reasonable grounds".

== See also ==
- Korematsu v. United States, internment of U.S. citizens of Japanese descent
