= Robert Liversidge =

British businessman

Robert William Liversidge (11 June 1904 – 30 September 1994), formerly Jacob (Jack) Perlsweig, was a British businessman whose activities sometimes attracted the attention of the police and intelligence services. He was also a reputed spy and the subject of a cause célèbre as an internee in Britain during the Second World War.

== Early life ==
Liversidge's parents, Asher Perlsweig, a rabbi, and Sarah, were Jewish immigrants to Britain from Russia. He was born in Harringay, London, one of five brothers and three sisters. He left school at the age of 14 and drifted before becoming involved in financial services. In July 1928 two of his associates, David and Dore Baumgart, were tried at the Old Bailey for conspiracy to defraud over share dealings in which Liversidge was also alleged to have been involved. An arrest warrant was issued for him, but it was never executed. He subsequently admitted that he had become involved with some dishonest people, but he always denied being guilty of any wrongdoing.

Some time before 1931 he adopted the name Liversidge (the married name of his eldest sister). In 1931 he applied for a Canadian passport in that name, claiming to have been born in Toronto and misstating his date of birth. He eventually managed a Hollywood recording studio, meeting a minor actress, Wanda Stevenson, and marrying her in 1936.

Liversidge returned to Britain in 1936, and became a wealthy and successful businessman. He legally changed his name to Liversidge in September 1937. However, his return was brought to the attention of the police by an informer and, although the arrest warrant from 1928 had been withdrawn in 1933, his Canadian passport was confiscated.

Liversidge's business activities brought him into contact both with people involved in the intelligence services and with people who held views sympathetic to fascism. Lord Verulam was associated with MI6. Cudbert Thornhill had been a military attaché in Petrograd from 1916 to 1918 and later worked in political intelligence in the Foreign Office during the Second World War. Norman Thwaites, who had worked in intelligence in New York City during the First World War and had recruited the spy Sidney Reilly, chaired meetings for the fascist January Club and was an associate of H. W. Luttman-Johnson. Compton Mackenzie had been an intelligence officer in the First World War and had become a prominent Scottish nationalist. William Stephenson was a Canadian spy. Van Lighten, a Dutchman, had tried to join MI5 and was viewed with suspicion by the intelligence services as possibly a German agent. Liversidge himself provided secrets to the War Office.

== In the Second World War ==
Liversidge volunteered for the army at the time of the Munich Agreement in September 1938 and for the Royal Air Force Volunteer Reserve in September 1939, using the false date and place of birth that he had used when obtaining his Canadian passport. He was commissioned Pilot Officer on 26 November 1939, and served as an intelligence officer in Bomber Command at RAF Wyton and RAF Wattisham, then in Fighter Command at RAF Biggin Hill and RAF Bentley Priory.

Defence Regulation 18B, which had been imposed at the start of the war, authorised internment. In early 1940 MI5 received intelligence that "three notorious Jew swindlers" were using "improper pressures brought to bear in High Places" to effect the release of internees from a camp at Seaton, Devon in return for payment of £500 (about £17,700 at 2003 prices). Thwaites was implicated, Liversidge was investigated, and the falsehoods about his birth were revealed. Liversidge was arrested on 26 April and charged with making a false statement. His flat was searched and the names of other persons known to the intelligence services were discovered. When he was interviewed it came to light that Liversidge had previously been Jack Perlsweig.

== Allegations ==
There seems to have been no evidence that Liversidge had "hostile associations" or had committed "acts prejudicial" to public safety. However, on 15 May the Secretary of State for Air, Sir Archibald Sinclair, wrote to the Home Office recommending that Liversidge be interned because "I am certain that you will agree that it is most undesirable that a man with the unsavoury and indeed dangerous associations of Perlsweig, who during recent months has had access to information of a most secret character, should be left at large either in the Service or in the Country."

The Reasons for Order served on Liversidge on 2 October alleged "hostile associations" only in count 7:

7. The said Liversidge was associated from time to time with Germans and with those associated with the German Secret Service.

Liversidge's lawyers demanded particulars of these associations, but were refused. The more detailed Statement of Case asserted that Liversidge had "a very bad record," and referred to the Baumgart case and the Canadian passport application. It then alleged, on the word of the informant from 1937, that Liversidge had used the alias "John Stone" and had been involved in a fraud in New York City. The New York police had shown no interest in pursuing the matter through extradition. The Statement also claimed that Liversidge was an "associate" of Van Lighten, and alleged that he was involved, with a Leon Nussbaum and an interned German national named Richard Markus, in dubious dealings in industrial diamonds.

The Statement concluded:

... he is completely unscrupulous and it may be that he has been recently concerned in acts prejudicial to public safety, although we have no direct evidence of this ... we submit that in view of the valuable information which he possesses it is essential in the interests of security that his detention should be continued.

== Internment ==
On 10 October Liversidge appealed against his detention before the Advisory Committee headed by Norman Birkett. He admitted the falsehoods on his passport application and his use of the alias "John Stone," but denied any fraud or association with Van Lighten. There were testimonials to his good character and an appearance by his fiancée, Clare McCririck. She and Aneurin Bevan, a personal friend of Liversidge's, had protested to the Home Office about the delay in the hearing.

The committee reported on 15 October. Its members were clearly troubled by the case, but deferred to the imperatives of a Fighter Command fully stretched by the Battle of Britain. They recommended detention with review on 4 December 1941. Herbert Morrison endorsed the decision on 11 December, probably after being canvassed by his fellow Labour MP Bevan. Simpson has alleged that anti-Semitism influenced the decision.

== Appeal ==
Liversidge sued for false imprisonment and the Crown filed a defence that he was lawfully detained under an 18B order. Liversidge then filed an application that the Crown disclose the grounds upon which the order was made, pleading that the Reasons for Order were insufficient. The application was dismissed by the High Court, as was an appeal to the Court of Appeal, and the case was brought to the House of Lords, joined with an appeal from another internee, Ben Greene. By a majority decision the Law Lords deferred to ministerial discretion on matters of national security in wartime. The application for disclosure was refused and Liversidge's internment was confirmed.

== Release and later life ==
On 9 November 1941, six days after the House of Lords issued its ruling, it was decided that there were no longer compelling reasons for Liversidge's detention. Liversidge was released on 31 December. Liversidge then joined the National Fire Service. After the war he became hugely wealthy through his continued business dealings. In 1948 he was called before the Lynskey Tribunal, as a friend of John Belcher, but he was exonerated of any misconduct. Until his death he remained bitter about his wartime treatment.

== Bibliography ==
- Simpson, A. W. B. (1992). In the Highest Degree Odious: Detention without Trial in Wartime Britain. Oxford: Oxford University Press. ISBN 0-19-825775-9.
