= Tournier v National Provincial and Union Bank of England =

Legal case in United Kingdom

- Court: Court of Appeal
- Citation: [1924] 1 KB 461

Tournier v National Provincial and Union Bank of England [1924] 1 KB 461 was a landmark legal case in the United Kingdom. The lead decision was given by Bankes LJ.

It established the conditions under which banks owed confidentiality to their clients, allowing four circumstances wherein banks were not required to guard privacy: where compelled by (1) law, (2) public duty, (3) the interest of the bank, or (4) where the client had consented, even implicitly, to disclosure.

In this case the bank disclosed to its customer's employer the fact that one of the customer's unpaid cheques was drawn in favour of a bookmaker's account. As a result, the customer's employer did not renew his contract with the customer. The Court of Appeal held that confidentiality was an implied term in the customer's contract and that any breach could give rise to liability in damages if loss results.
