= Arthur Greer, 1st Baron Fairfield =

British lawyer and judge (1863–1945)

The Right Honourable The Lord Fairfield PC

Lord Justice of Appeal

Justice of the High Court

Personal details
- Born: 1 October 1863
- Died: 4 February 1945 (aged 81)
- Spouse(s): Katherine van Noorden (m. 1901, died) Mabel Lily Fraser (m. 1939)

Frederick Arthur Greer, 1st Baron Fairfield, PC (1 October 1863 – 4 February 1945) was a British lawyer and judge. Born to a merchant and his wife, Greer became a barrister and member of Gray's Inn, practicing in Liverpool. In 1910 he became a King's Counsel, and in 1919 a judge of the High Court of Justice. In 1939 he was elevated to the peerage as Baron Fairfield.

== Background and education ==
Greer was born to merchant Arthur Greer, who lived in Liverpool and the Isle of Man, and his wife, Mary Hadfield Greer, (née Moore). He was educated at Old Aberdeen Grammar School before studying mental philosophy at the University of Aberdeen, where he graduated with first-class honours and won the Fullerton scholarship.

== Career ==
In 1886, he was called to the Bar at Gray's Inn after winning the Bacon and Arden scholarships, and began practising as a barrister in Liverpool, where he met Moelwyn Hughes and Rigby Swift among others. His practice steadily grew, and in 1910 he became a King's Counsel. After continuing his career in London he was appointed a judge of the High Court of Justice (King's Bench Division) by Lord Birkenhead, and given the customary knighthood.

In 1927 he became a Lord Justice of Appeal, sitting in the Court of Appeal of England and Wales, and was also made a Privy Councillor. In 1932 he served as the British representative to the International Congress of Comparative Law at The Hague, and in 1939 he was raised to the peerage as Baron Fairfield, of Caldy in the County Palatine of Chester. He died at home on 4 February 1945, at which point the peerage became extinct.

As a judge, some of his more notable decisions included:

- Hall v Brooklands Auto-Racing Club [1933] 1 KB 205
- John Shaw & Sons (Salford) Ltd v Shaw [1935] 2 KB 113

== Personal life ==
On 17 August 1901 he married Katherine van Noorden, and the couple had one daughter, Louise Mary Greer, who married Moelwyn Hughes.

After the death of Katherine he married Mabel Lily Fraser in 1939.

Peerage of the United Kingdom
New creation	Baron Fairfield; 1939–1945	Extinct
