= Clement Bailhache =

English judge (1856–1924)

Sir Clement Bailhache
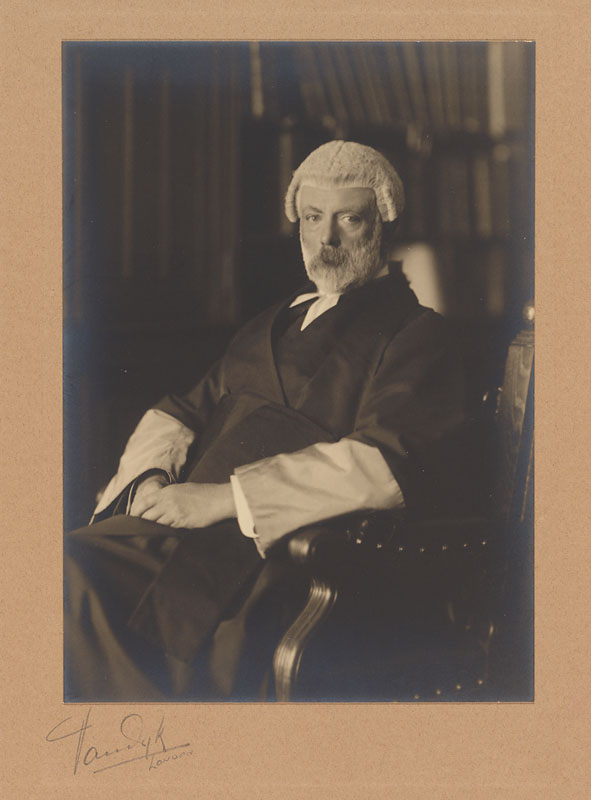

Justice of the High Court
- In office 1912 – 8 September 1924

Personal details
- Education: City of London School; University of London

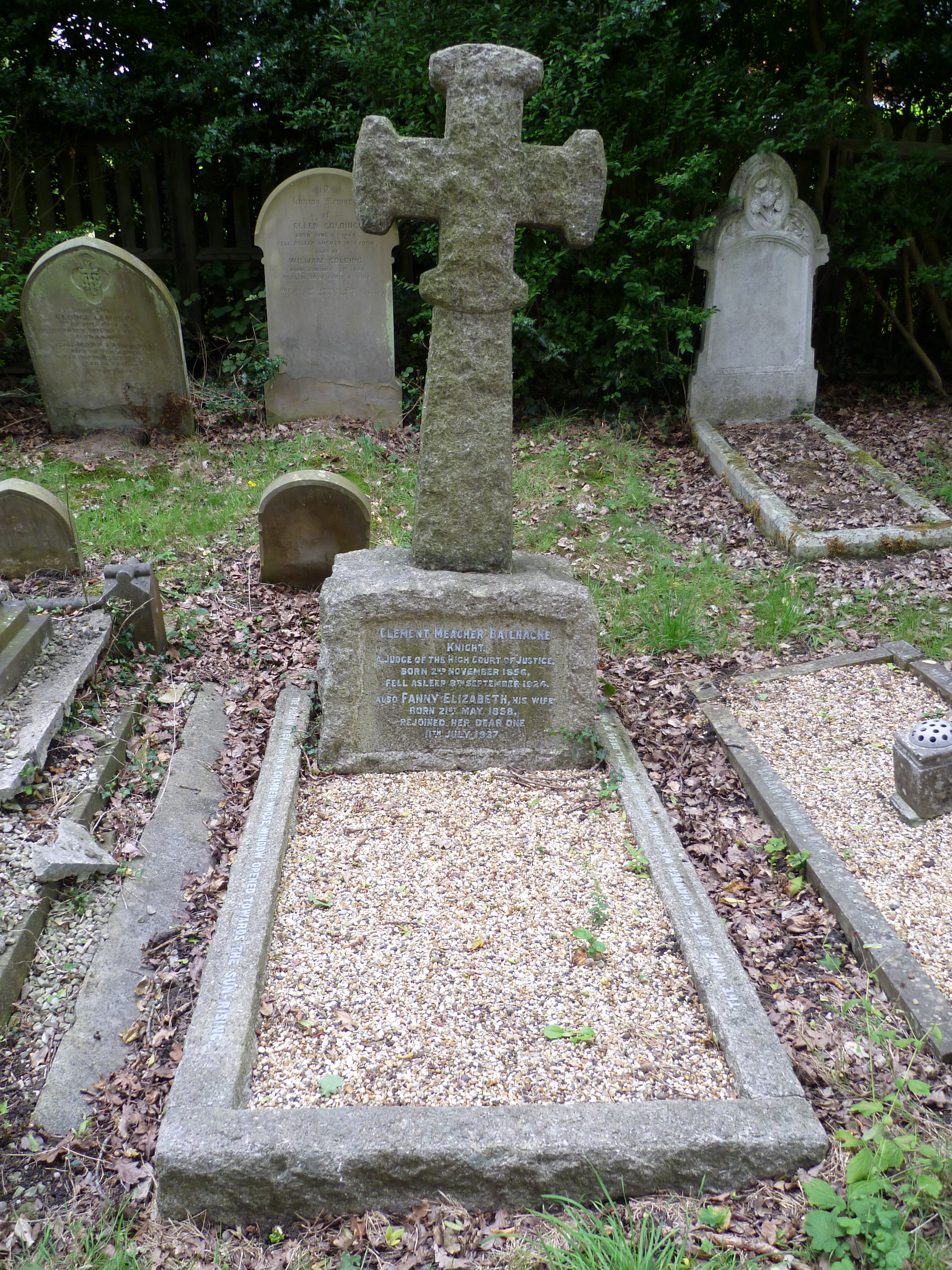
Grave of Clement and Fanny Bailhache, St Andrew's church, Totteridge.

Sir Clement Meacher Bailhache (2 November 1856 – 8 September 1924) was an English commercial lawyer and judge.

== Early life ==
Bailhache was born at Leeds, the eldest son of Rev. Clement Bailhache, of Huguenot descent, a Baptist minister and secretary of the Baptist Missionary Society; his mother, Emma, was daughter of Edward Augustus Meacher, of Ivinghoe, Buckinghamshire. He was educated at the City of London School and studied law at the University of London, graduating in 1877.

== Career ==
Bailhache initially practised as a solicitor in Newport, Monmouthshire, marrying Fanny Elizabeth Liebstein in 1881. The couple had a son and two daughters. However, it soon became clear that he possessed considerable skills as an advocate, skills under used as a provincial attorney. To pursue a career as a barrister, he entered the Middle Temple and was called to the bar in 1889. He practised in commercial law on the south Wales circuit, his existing network in the legal profession enabling him to advance rapidly. He soon attracted the attention of The City and he became in demand in London in the newly established Commercial Court.

Bailhache was elected to represent Finchley North on Middlesex County Council in 1898. He served a single three-year term, stepping down in 1901. He was also a member of Finchley Urban District Council.

Bailhache was made KC in 1908 and appeared in a Commercial Court graced by the advocacy of Thomas Edward Scrutton and John Hamilton. However, his two senior colleagues soon became High Court judges and Bailhache inherited an extensive practice. He had a great mastery of complex facts and law, and was concise in summarising them. "Few leaders at the bar have said so little or said it so well."

With the growth of commercial litigation in the early twentieth century, by 1912 the Commercial Court was in need of more judges and Bailhache was elevated to a judge of the High Court with the customary knighthood. As a judge, he worked through his list briskly, often paying insufficient attention to the arguments of counsel and often, in consequence, giving rise to successful appeals. He was clear in his judgments though disliked having to reserve judgment. In 1916 he chaired a committee of enquiry into the Royal Flying Corps but did little other enquiry work.

== Personal life ==
Bailhache maintained his Baptist faith throughout his life and was a committed teetotaller. He was an enthusiastic pipe smoker, even during formal dinners.

== Death ==
Bailhache died from a cerebral haemorrhage at Aldeburgh, Suffolk. He is buried at St Andrew's church, Totteridge, with his wife Fanny Elizabeth (21 May 1858 – 11 July 1937).

== References and sources ==
Sources

- Law Journal, 13 Sept 1924, 581
