= Thomas Warrington, 1st Baron Warrington of Clyffe =

British lawyer and judge

The Right Honourable The Lord Warrington of Clyffe PC
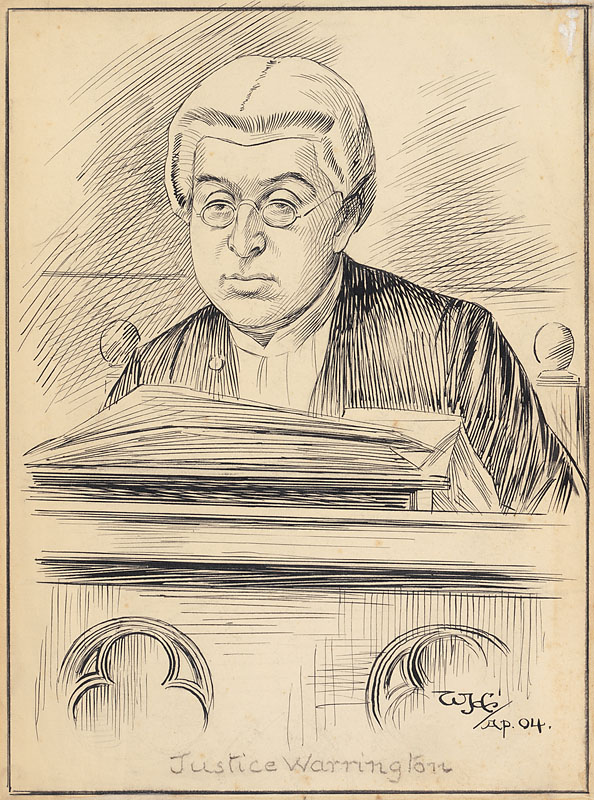

Lord Justice of Appeal

Justice of the High Court
- Succeeded by: Sir Robert Younger

Personal details
- Born: Thomas Rolls Warrington

Thomas Rolls Warrington, 1st Baron Warrington of Clyffe, PC (29 May 1851 – 26 October 1937), known as Sir Thomas Warrington between 1904 and 1926, was a British lawyer and judge.

Warrington was called to the Bar, Lincoln's Inn, in 1875, and after acquiring a large practice, became a Queen's Counsel in 1895. In 1904 he was appointed a judge of the Chancery Division of the High Court of Justice and knighted. In 1915 he became a Lord Justice of Appeal and sworn of the Privy Council, which entitled him to sit on the Judicial Committee of the Privy Council. On his retirement in 1926 he was elevated to the peerage as Baron Warrington of Clyffe, of Market Lavington in the County of Wiltshire. He continued to sit on the Judicial Committee after his retirement.

Lord Warrington of Clyffe died in October 1937, aged 86, when the barony became extinct.

== Judgements ==
- Barron v Potter [1914] 1 Ch 895 - a UK company law case, concerning the balance of power between the board of directors and the general meeting, and standing for the principle that when the board is incapable of taking action, power to conduct the company's affairs will revert to the general meeting.
- Short v Poole Corporation [1926] Ch. 66: Warrington's example in this case of a red-haired teacher, dismissed from her post because she has red hair, was later referenced in Associated Provincial Picture Houses Ltd v Wednesbury Corporation [1947], the case which defined "Wednesbury unreasonableness" in relation to the decision of a public body in England and Wales. Warrington referred to the example as
  "unreasonable in one sense. In another sense it is taking into consideration extraneous matters. It is so unreasonable that it might almost be described as being done in bad faith ... [No] public body can be regarded as having statutory authority to act in bad faith or from corrupt motives, and any action purporting to be that of the body, but proved to be committed in bad faith or from corrupt motives, would certainly be held to be inoperative.

Peerage of the United Kingdom
New creation	Baron Warrington of Clyffe; 1926 – 1937	Extinct
