= John Eldon Bankes =

Welsh judge (1854–1946)

The Right Honourable Sir Eldon Bankes GCB
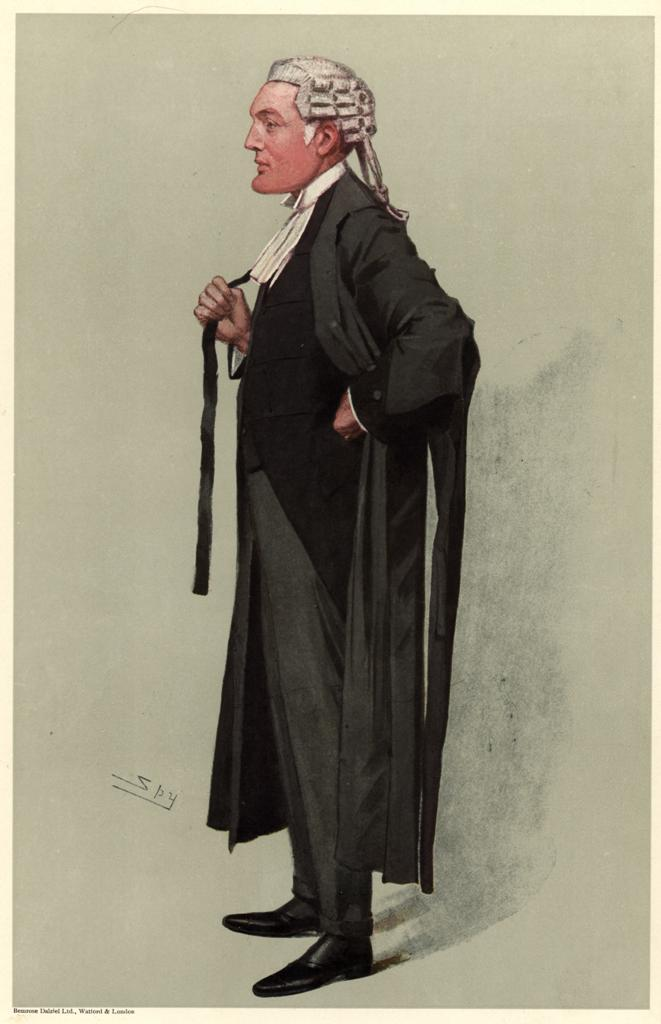
- Caricature of Sir Eldon Bankes, published in Vanity Fair, 29 March 1906

Lord Justice of Appeal
- In office 1915–1927

Judge of King's Bench Division, High Court
- In office 1910–1915

Personal details
- Born: 17 April 1854 Northop, Flintshire, Wales
- Died: 31 December 1946 (aged 92)

Sir John Eldon Bankes, GCB, PC (17 April 1854 – 31 December 1946) was a Welsh judge of the King's Bench Division of the High Court of Justice, and later a Lord Justice of Appeal.

== Biography ==
Born in Northop, Flintshire on 17 April 1854, he was the eldest son of John Scott Bankes (1826-1896) and his first wife, Annie (1829-1876), daughter of Sir John Jervis, himself a chief justice. He was educated at Eton College and Christ Church, Oxford, where he rowed for Oxford University Boat Club.

Called to the Bar at the Inner Temple in 1878, he took silk in 1901. Whilst on the bench, he was often referred to as J. Eldon Bankes. In 1910 he became a judge of the High Court, and in 1915 a Lord Justice of Appeal and a Privy Councillor. He retired from the bench in 1927.

Bankes was chairman of Quarter Sessions in Flintshire for 33 years, and as a Conservative an active member of Flintshire County Council, of which he was chairman in 1933. He unsuccessfully contested the Flint District constituency in 1906. Bankes was on numerous commissions or committees of inquiry, including: Chairman of the Departmental Committee on Education in Rural Wales, 1928; and as a prominent Anglican, with Lord Sankey he drafted the new constitution of the Church in Wales.

On the death of his father, he inherited the family home of Soughton Hall, Flintshire. He married Edith Ethelston in 1882 (d. 1931), and the couple had two sons and two daughters. In 1921, Bankes was made an honorary LL.D. of the University of Wales. The Northop Village Hall was endowed as the Edith Bankes Memorial Institute in her memory.

Bankes died at his home in North Wales on 31 December 1946, aged 92. After his death, the Soughton estate passed to their second son, Robert Wynne Bankes, who served as Private Secretary to successive Lord Chancellors. After the death of his mother, his son, John Wynne Bankes, sold the hall into private hands, and in 1987 it was converted into a country house hotel.

== Notable judicial decisions ==
Bankes handed down a number of notable decisions during his judicial career, predominantly in the field of banking law. Key decisions included:

- Tournier v National Provincial and Union Bank of England [1924] 1 KB 461, the leading authority on a banker's duty of confidentiality
- Russian Commercial and Industrial Bank v Comptoir d'Estcompte de Mulhouse [1925] AC 112, on the authority of the bank's officers
- National Provincial Bank v Charnley [1924] 1 KB 431, priority between competing security interests
- Banque Belge pour L'Etranger v Hambrouck [1921] 1 KB 321, on knowing receipt and tracing
- Joachimson v Swiss Bank Corporation [1921] 3 KB 110, on the banker-customer relationship

He chaired the Royal Commission on the Private Manufacture of and Trading in Arms in 1935–1936.
