= Terrell v Secretary of State for the Colonies =

- Court: High Court, Queen's Bench Division
- Decided: 19 June 1953
- Citation: [1953] 2 QB 482; [1953] 3 WLR 331

Court membership
- Judge sitting: Lord Goddard CJ

Terrell v Secretary of State for the Colonies [1953] 2 QB 482 is an English case concerning the tenure of colonial judges.

== Facts ==
In 1930, Terrell was appointed to be a puisne judge of the Supreme Court of Malaya. By a letter written on behalf of the Secretary of State for the Colonies, he was informed that his compulsory retirement age as judge was 62. In 1942, Malaya was invaded and occupied by Japan. As a result, the Secretary of State informed Terrell that his service was no longer required, and his appointment was terminated on 7 July 1942, 17 months before his mandatory retirement age.

Terrell contested the validity of his retirement. The case was referred to an arbitrator, who found against Terrell, who appealed to the High Court.

== Judgment ==
Lord Goddard found that the termination of Terrell's appointment was valid. In particular, he rejected the contention that Terrell could only be removed by the Sovereign on presentation of addresses by both houses of Parliament, pursuant to the procedure set out in section 3 of the Act of Settlement. Colonial judges, unlike judges of English superior courts, held their offices at the Sovereign's pleasure, and could be dismissed at any time before their mandatory retirement age.
