= Lydecker =

Lydecker is a surname. Notable people with the surname include:

- The Lydecker brothers, Howard "Babe" Lydecker (1911-1969) and Theodore Lydecker (1908-1990), a movie special effects team
- John Lydecker, a pen name of English writer Stephen Gallagher (born 1954)
- Waldo Lydecker, a main character in the 1944 film noir Laura, played by Clifton Webb
