= Bob Mahoney =

Bob Mahoney may refer to:

- Bob Mahoney (baseball) (1928–2000), American baseball pitcher
- Bob Mahoney (director), English film director and producer

== See also ==
- Robert Mahoney (1921–2017), member of the Michigan House of Representatives
