= Chiller (TV series) =

1995 TV series

- Genre: Supernatural
- Written by: Stephen Gallagher; Glenn Chandler; Anthony Horowitz
- Directed by: Lawrence G. Clark; Bob Mahoney; Rob Walker
- Starring: Nigel Havers; Sophie Ward; Tony Haygarth; Martin Clunes; Serena Gordon; Phyllis Logan; John Simm; Peter Egan; Miles Anderson; Kevin McNally; Maggie O'Neill; Lorraine Ashbourne; Don Warrington
- Composers: Joe Campbell; Paul Hart; Colin Towns
- Country of origin: United Kingdom
- Original language: English
- No. of seasons: 1
- No. of episodes: 5

Production
- Executive producer: David Reynolds
- Producers: Lawrence G. Clark; Peter Lover
- Production location: United Kingdom
- Cinematography: Alan Pyrah; Chris O'Dell
- Editors: Tim Ritson; Clive Trist
- Running time: 60 minutes
- Production company: Yorkshire Television

Original release
- Network: ITV
- Release: 9 March – 27 April 1995

Chiller is a five-part British horror fantasy anthology television series, produced by Yorkshire Television, that first broadcast on ITV on 9 March 1995. Described by The Guardian as ITV's "answer to The X-Files", the series was inspired by, but unconnected to, the 1991 Channel 4 thriller Gray Clay Dolls, which broadcast under the Chiller banner. The series featured writing contributions from renowned playwrights Stephen Gallagher, Glenn Chandler and Anthony Horowitz.

Each story involves, to some extent, a supernatural element; and also a number of leading British actors, including the likes of Nigel Havers, Martin Clunes, John Simm, Peter Egan and Kevin McNally. Lawrence Gordon Clark, a former showrunner for the BBC's A Ghost Story for Christmas strand, acts as executive producer, alongside David Reynolds and Peter Lover. The series' opening episode, Prophecy, was adapted from a story by novelist Peter James. The complete series of Chiller was released on Region 2 DVD via Network Distributing on 1 July 2013. Shout! Factory, copyright holders of the series, uploaded all five episodes to YouTube on 31 October 2018 as part of their Halloween celebrations, but subsequently removed them.

== Reception ==
George Bass, writing for The Guardian wrote; "Chiller is worth it for Toby alone, but the other four stories will spook you out too. Martin Clunes appears an overworked and sceptical professional; such characters recur, particularly in opener The Prophecy. We watch as death catches up with a circle of college friends, only one of whom (a young Sophie Ward) was smart enough to see that there may be trouble ahead after a ouija board delivers the verdict death/death/death."

He continued; "It’s a tale that bears astonishing similarities to the Final Destination film franchise. Then there are the blinkered sceptics standing firm against overwhelming evidence, and contrived deaths galore. Chiller is reminder of a time when networks weren’t afraid of giving horror writers free rein. It also features John Simm as a seriously ill young man, delivering the line: “If it wasn’t for the murders, and all the psychiatric problems, and me breaking into your house and bringing you here, and everything, do you think you could’ve taken to me at all?”

In a review of Prophecy, critic David Howe praised the serial as "...the tale of eerie coincidence and death rattled along at a tremendous pace, leaving the viewer breathless. At the end of it, I found myself wondering whether I had just watched a 90 minute film, rather than a 50 minute drama, such was the amount of characterisation and plot that Gallagher managed to cram in." However, Howe criticised the relationship between the widowed aristocrat Oliver Halkin (Nigel Havers) and Fransesca "Fanny" Monsanto (Sophie Ward), under the grounds that Ward was young enough to be Havers' daughter and argued that it was implausible that the young people who attended the seance did not visibly age over the course of the five years afterwards.

== Episodes ==
No.	Title	Directed by	Written by	British air date
1	"Prophecy"	Lawrence Gordon Clark	Stephen Gallagher	9 March 1995
Cast: Nigel Havers as Oliver Halkin; Sophie Ward as Fransesca Monsanto; Tony Haygarth as Father Benedict Spode; Adam Levy as Sebastian Holland; Samantha Holland as Susie Verbeeten; Kate Isitt as Meredith Minns; Mark Aiken as Declan O'Hare; When a group of friends hold a séance in the basement of a London café they each receive a prophecy. Five years later and the prophecies have started to come true, but who made them and what is the connection with Oliver Halkin and his troubled son Edward?
2	"Toby"	Bob Mahoney	Glenn Chandler	23 March 1995
Cast: Martin Clunes as Ray Knight; Serena Gordon as Louise Knight; Rosemary Leach as Mrs. Leslie; Alan David as Dr. Getty; Brigitte Kahn as Dr. Rawlings; Ray and Louise Knight tragically lose Toby, their unborn baby, in a car accident. Although Louise has not made love since the accident, she soon discovers she's pregnant again. A routine scan reveals she is not pregnant, but her body insists she is. Incredibly, she goes to full term and even into labour, but to everyone's bewilderment, there's no baby. Then one night, Louise hears crying from the nursery and finds an old man with special powers who tells her that Toby is present and playing a horrible game with her.
3	"Here Comes the Mirror Man"	Lawrence Gordon Clark	Stephen Gallagher	30 March 1995
Cast: Phyllis Logan as Anna Spalinsky; John Simm as Gary Kingston; Paul Reynolds as Michael; Matthew Scurfield as Trevor; Rebecca Callard as Sonja; Anna Keaveney as Wendy Francis; When the schizophrenic Gary Kingston murders his social worker, his case is handed over to the unsuspecting Anna Spalinsky. Social Services know that when Gary doesn't take his medication his friend Michael can exert an undue influence over him. But who is Michael?
4	"The Man Who Didn't Believe in Ghosts"	Bob Mahoney	Anthony Horowitz	13 April 1995
Cast: Peter Egan as Richard Cramer; Miles Anderson as Peter Walker; Helen Caldwell as Rosemary Walker; Mel Martin as Sophie Cramer; Tobias Saunders as Matthew Cramer; Richard Cramer, a professional de-bunker of the paranormal, moves into Windwhistle Hall with his family, only to find themselves involved in a series of unexplained events and accidents. They must uncover whether it is a series of bizarre coincidences, or hauntings of the former occupant's ghost.
5	"Number Six"	Rob Walker	Anthony Horowitz	27 April 1995
Cast: Kevin McNally as Jack Taylor; Maggie O'Neill as Emma Holman; Lorraine Ashbourne as Susan Taylor; Don Warrington as John Meybourne; Kelvin Fletcher as Gordon; John McEnery as Mr. Keegan; Barbara Ewing as Mrs. Keegan; Jack Taylor is the homicide detective investigating the murders of five children. Aware that the serial killer is likely to strike for the sixth time, he discovers a connection to an ancient Druidic site, and learns that the consequences of failing to stop the next killing would be far more horrifying and personal than he could ever have imagined.
