= Let Him Have It =

1991 British film by Peter Medak

- Theatrical release poster
- Directed by: Peter Medak
- Written by: Neal Purvis; Robert Wade
- Produced by: Luc Roeg; Robert Warr
- Starring: Christopher Eccleston; Paul Reynolds; Tom Bell; Eileen Atkins; Clare Holman; Michael Elphick; Mark McGann; Tom Courtenay
- Cinematography: Oliver Stapleton
- Edited by: Ray Lovejoy
- Music by: Michael Kamen
- Production companies: British Screen Productions; Le Studio Canal+; Film Trustees Ltd.; Jennie and Company; Pierson; Vermillion; Vivid Entertainment
- Distributed by: First Independent Films
- Release date: 4 October 1991 (London)
- Running time: 115 min
- Country: United Kingdom
- Language: English
- Budget: £2 million
- Box office: $88,686 (US) £292,525 (UK)

Let Him Have It is a 1991 British drama film directed by Peter Medak and starring Christopher Eccleston, Paul Reynolds, Tom Courtenay and Tom Bell. The film is based on the true story of Derek Bentley, who was convicted of the murder of a police officer by joint enterprise and was hanged in 1953 under controversial circumstances.

== Plot summary ==
Derek Bentley is an illiterate, epileptic young adult with developmental disabilities who falls into a gang led by a younger teenager named Christopher Craig. During the course of the robbery of a warehouse in Croydon, in which Bentley is encouraged to participate by Craig, the two become trapped by the police. Officers order Craig to put down his gun. Bentley, who by this time has already been arrested, shouts "Let him have it, Chris" – whether he means the phrase literally ("Let him have the gun") or figuratively ("Open fire!") is unclear. Craig fires, killing one officer and wounding another. Because Craig is a minor, he cannot be executed and is given a prison sentence. Meanwhile, Bentley is sentenced to death under the English common law principle of joint enterprise, on the basis that his statement to Craig was an instigation to shoot. Bentley's family makes an effort for clemency which reaches Parliament. However, the Home Secretary (who has the power to commute the death sentence) ultimately declines to intervene. Despite his family's efforts and public support, Bentley is executed in 1953 within a month of being convicted, before Parliament takes any official action.

== Cast ==
- Christopher Eccleston as Derek Bentley
- Paul Reynolds as Christopher Craig
- Tom Courtenay as William Bentley
- Eileen Atkins as Lilian Bentley
- Clare Holman as Iris Bentley
- Tom Bell as Detective Sergeant Fairfax
- Edward Hardwicke as Approved school principal
- Serena Scott Thomas as Stella
- Mark McGann as Niven Craig
- Murray Melvin as Secondary school teacher
- Michael Gough as Lord Goddard
- Iain Cuthbertson as Sir David Maxwell-Fyfe
- Peter Eyre as Humphreys
- James Villiers as Cassels
- Clive Revill as Albert Pierrepoint (hangman)
- Vernon Dobtcheff as Court clerk
- Bill Dean as Foreman of the jury
- Norman Rossington as Postman
- Michael Elphick as Prison officer Jack

== Production ==
Paul Bergman and Michael Asimow call attention to the cross examination scene, where "the camera closes in on [Bentley's] bruised face as the prosecutor and judge bombard him with questions he can barely comprehend."

The film's end titles state that Bentley's sister, Iris, was still fighting for his pardon. Seven years after the film was made and after numerous unsuccessful campaigns to get Bentley a full pardon, his conviction was eventually overturned by the Court of Appeal on 30 July 1998, one year after Iris's death.

== Release ==
The film opened at the Odeon Leicester Square in London on 4 October 1991 before expanding to 120 screens the following week.

== Reception ==
The film gained positive reviews from critics. It holds an 84% approval rating from the review aggregation site Rotten Tomatoes based on 37 reviews, with an average rating of 7.7/10. The website's critical consensus reads, "Led by a gripping performance from Christopher Eccleston, Let Him Have It sounds a compelling call for justice on behalf of its real-life protagonist."

Tom Wiener said that the film displayed the writers Neal Purvis and Robert Wade's "outrage toward a system hell-bent on vengeance" and John Ivan Simon called the script "first rate, no nonsense".
