= Paul Reynolds (actor) =

English actor (born 1970)

- Born: 6 February 1970 (age 56); Wanstead, London, England, U.K.
- Occupations: Actor, producer
- Years active: 1982–present

Paul Reynolds (born 6 February 1970) is an English actor, his roles include portraying Colin Mathews in Press Gang (1989–1993), Kelvin Raine in Maisie Raine (1998) and convicted police murderer Chris Craig in Let Him Have It (1991).

== Early life ==
Reynolds was born in Wanstead, London, and attended the Sylvia Young Theatre School.

== Career ==
Reynolds' breakthrough role on television came playing Thatcherite Colin Mathews in the BAFTA award-winning ITV series Press Gang. His career continued with the roles of Kevin in The Ghostbusters of East Finchley, and Sammy Dobbs, the unscrupulous sports agent, in Andy Hamilton's Trevor's World of Sport.

On the big screen, Reynolds portrayed Christopher Craig opposite Christopher Eccleston's Derek Bentley in Let Him Have It and the mischievous Matt in Croupier alongside Clive Owen.

In later years, Reynolds made appearances as Squeak in Absolutely Fabulous alongside Julia Sawalha, his Press Gang co-star. In 2008, he also made a cameo appearance in Lark Rise to Candleford, again with Julia Sawalha.

As well as many TV, film and radio appearances, Reynolds has appeared on stage in leading roles at The National Theatre, the Royal Court Theatre, The Almeida and The Bristol Old Vic portraying Baby in Mojo and Eugene in Neil Simon's Brighton Beach Memoirs.

Reynolds also spent ten years in the BBC World Service radio drama Westway playing Fizza.

In 2005 Reynolds had a break from acting to set up his own production company called Remould Media which specialised in filming concerts as well as developing TV and film scripts and ideas. He currently conducts his own production work.

In 2007, Reynolds voiced the Fox in an advertising campaign for Fox's Glacier Mints, alongside Simon Callow who voiced Peppy the polar bear.

He starred in Lucky You, a stage adaptation of Carl Hiaasen's novel of the same title which premiered at the 2008 Edinburgh Festival Fringe.

== Selected filmography ==
=== Film ===
Year	Title	Role	Notes
1982	The Beastmaster	Tils	
1986	Castaway	Mike Kingsland	
1989	Slipstream	Travis	
1991	Let Him Have It	Christopher Craig	
1995	Blue Juice	Recording Engineer	
1998	Croupier	Matt	
2000	Stardom	Nigel Pope	
2000	The Asylum	Snape	
2002	Revengers Tragedy	Junior	
2011	Maltempi	Jeff	Short film
2014	The Guvnors	Big Tone	
2016	Eddie the Eagle	Clive North UK Reporter	
2016	Level Up	Taxi Driver	
2017	Aux	DI Reed	

=== Television ===
Year	Title	Role	Notes
1985	Terry & June	Wayne	Episode: "New Doors For Old"
1986	No Place Like Home	Wayne	Episode: "The Video"
1988	Ten Great Writers of the Modern World	Young Marcel Proust	1 episode (mini series)
1989	Great Expectations	The Avenger	1 episode (mini series)
1989–1993	Press Gang	Colin Matthews	43 episodes
1991	All Good Things	Anthony Frame	5 episodes
1991–2010	The Bill	Tony Cook, Jeff Childs, Anthony Lippi, David Cooper	4 episodes
1992–2015	Casualty	Alan Morgan, Ken Crowley, Roddy Scotton, Pete Lewis	4 episodes
1993	Frank Stubbs Promotes	Bruce	Episode: "Paint"
1993	Screen One	Brian	Money For Nothing
1994	Minder	Gino	Episode: "A Fridge Too Far"
1994	Screen Two	Dog	Dirtysomething
1995	Absolutely Fabulous	Squeak	Episode: "Jealous"
1995	Chiller	Michael	Here Comes the Mirror Man
1995	Lloyds Bank Channel 4 Film Challenge	Colin	Beachy Head
1995	The Ghostbusters of East Finchley	Kevin Pullen	6 episodes
1995–1997	Cone Zone	Rick Sullivan	3 episodes
1996	Pie in the Sky	Jason Preece	2 episodes
1997	The Locksmith	Dixie	3 episodes
1998	Maisie Raine	Kevin Raine	8 episodes
1999	Mike & Angelo	Dicky Greeb	Episode: "Mr Motormouth"
1999	Murder Most Horrid	David Flint	Episode: "Elvis, Jesus and Zak"
1999	Privates	Croucher	1 episode (pilot)
2000	Time Gentleman Please	Keith Harney	Episode; "Greeting Stout Yeoman"
2001	Office Gossip	Bill	Episode: "Work Experience"
2002	The Jury	Warren Murphy	5 episodes
2003	Trevor's World of Sport	Sammy Dobbs	7 episodes
2004	Waking the Dead	DS Dave Marvin	2 episodes
2004–2006	Holby City	Phil Locke, Davdi Sorokowski	2 episodes
2005	Murder in Suburbia	Tony Drinkwater	Episode: "Estate Agents"
2005	The Smoking Room	Policeman	Episode: "Smashed"
2007	The Last Detective	Shifty Driver	Episode: "The Man from Montevideo"
2008	Lark Rise to Candleford	Brewery Salesman	2 episodes
2008	M.I. High	Quentin Flake	Episode: "You Can Call Me Al"
2010	Lewis	Mr. Davies	Episode: "Your Sudden Death Question"
2012	EastEnders	Gerry	1 episode
2013	Quick Cuts	Trevor	3 episodes
2016	Harley and the Davisons	Worker #2	Episode: "Legacy"
2017	Doctors	Adam Smith	Episode: "The Second Best Man"
2017	Midsomer Murders	Butler Styles	Episode: "Last Man Out"
2018	Humans	Father at Stall	1 episode
2019	Pure	Tim	1 episode
2022	Dodger	Hezekiah Stebbing	3 episodes
