= Home and Away (1972 TV series) =

- Genre: Drama
- Written by: Julia Jones
- Directed by: Roy Battersby; Donald McWhinnie
- Starring: Gillian Raine; Rosalind Ayres; George Sewell
- Country of origin: United Kingdom
- Original language: English
- No. of series: 1
- No. of episodes: 7

Production
- Producer: Kenith Trodd
- Running time: 60 minutes
- Production company: Granada Television

Original release
- Network: ITV
- Release: 14 February – 27 March 1972

Home and Away is a British television drama series which aired in seven parts on ITV in 1972.

== Cast ==
- Rosalind Ayres as Grace
- Tony Melody as Godfrey
- Gillian Raine as Brenda
- George Sewell as Winslow Scott
- Stephen Temperley as Edward
- Bernard Wrigley as Office Clerk

== Bibliography ==
- Paul Cornell, Martin Day & Keith Topping. The Guinness Book of Classic British TV. Guinness, 1996.
