= Derek Bentley =

British man hanged but later pardoned (1933–1953)

- Born: 30 June 1933; Southwark, London, England
- Died: 28 January 1953 (aged 19); Wandsworth Prison, London, England
- Resting place: Wandsworth Prison Cemetery; Reburied Croydon Cemetery (1966)
- Known for: Wrongful conviction and execution
- Status: Executed by hanging (1953): Posthumous pardon (1993); Conviction overturned (1998)
- Conviction: Murder (overturned)
- Penalty: Death by hanging
- Accomplice: Christopher Craig

Derek William Bentley (30 June 1933 – 28 January 1953) was a British man who was hanged for being the accomplice of a murder of a policeman during an attempted burglary. His accomplice, Christopher Craig, then aged 16, was convicted of the murder. Bentley was convicted as a party to the crime under the English law principle of joint enterprise, as the burglary had been committed in mutual understanding and the bringing of deadly weapons. Lord Chief Justice Goddard's decision to sentence Bentley to death despite the jury's recommendation for mercy, and Home Secretary David Maxwell Fyfe's refusal to grant clemency to Bentley, were highly controversial.

The jury at the trial found Bentley guilty based in large part on the prosecution's interpretation of the ambiguous phrase "Let him have it", Bentley's alleged exhortation to Craig, which prosecutors argued was an order to shoot and defence counsel argued was an order to surrender; this after Goddard had described Bentley as "mentally aiding" the murder.

The Bentley case became a cause célèbre and led to a 40-year-long campaign to win Bentley a posthumous pardon, which was granted in 1993, and then a further campaign for the quashing of his murder conviction, which occurred in 1998. Bentley's case is thus considered a case of miscarriage of justice alongside that of Timothy Evans, and pivotal in the successful campaign to abolish capital punishment in the United Kingdom.

== Early life ==
Bentley was born to William and Lilian Bentley, who raised their family in Blackfriars, London. He had one brother and two sisters. At his birth, it was discovered that he was the first of twins; the other infant was stillborn. Another sister, along with his aunt and grandmother, died in The Blitz. In infancy, Derek survived pneumonia. At age 4, he fell onto concrete from the back of a parked truck and appeared to have an epileptic seizure. He suffered from severe headaches and petit mal seizures, which caused him to lose track of time. His parents reported that he had three additional grand mal seizures, including one in which they said he nearly died of choking.

In 1944, Bentley entered Norbury Manor Secondary Modern School, after failing the eleven-plus examination. In 1948, at age 15, he was found to have an IQ score of 66, indicating a mental age of 10 years and 4 months. His reading age was 4.5 years; that is, he was illiterate.

In March 1948, he and another boy were arrested for theft. Bentley was sentenced to serve three years at Kingswood Approved School near Bristol. Christopher Craig also attended the school.

At the Child Guidance Clinic near Kingswood, Bentley's IQ score was found to be 77. Kingswood staff reported that he was "lazy, indifferent, voluble and of the 'wise guy' type"; a court described him as "indifferent, smug, self-satisfied and ready to tell tales". He was examined twice by EEG: a reading on 16 November 1949 indicated he was an epileptic and a reading on 9 February 1950 was "abnormal". After his arrest in November 1952, further IQ tests were administered at Brixton Prison. He was described as "borderline feeble-minded", with a verbal score of 71, a performance IQ of 87 and a full scale IQ of 77. Bentley was discovered to still be "quite illiterate". The prison medical officer said he "cannot even recognise or write down all the letters of the alphabet".

Bentley was released from Kingswood on 28 July 1950, a year early, though he was told that he would remain under the care of Kingswood until 29 September 1954. He was a recluse for the rest of 1950, rarely venturing out of the house until January 1951.

In March 1951, he was hired by a moving company but, in May 1952, injured his back and had to leave the job. In May 1952, he was hired by the Croydon Corporation as a refuse collector; one month later, he was demoted to street sweeper and the following month, he was fired. He was still unemployed at the time of his final arrest.

== Crime ==
On the night of Sunday 2 November 1952, Bentley and Craig broke into the warehouse of the Barlow & Parker confectionery company at 27–29 Tamworth Road, Croydon. Craig armed himself with a .455 Webley calibre Colt New Service revolver, the barrel of which he had shortened so that it could be carried easily in his pocket. He also carried a number of undersized rounds for the revolver, some of which he had modified by hand to fit the gun. Bentley carried a small knife and a knuckleduster, which had been given to him by Craig, who had been fined the previous year for possessing a firearm without a certificate.

At around 9:15 pm, neighbours called police after spotting Craig and Bentley climbing over the gate and up a drainpipe to the roof of the warehouse. When police arrived, Craig and Bentley hid behind the lift-housing. Craig taunted the police. One of the officers, Detective Constable Frederick Fairfax, climbed the drainpipe to the roof and grabbed hold of Bentley, who broke free. What happened then is uncertain: police witnesses later claimed that Fairfax ordered Craig to "Hand over the gun, lad" and Bentley shouted, "Let him have it, Chris". Craig fired, striking Fairfax in the shoulder. Fairfax was nonetheless again able to restrain Bentley, who told Fairfax that Craig had further ammunition for the gun. Bentley had not used the two weapons in his pockets.

Additional uniformed police officers arrived. The first to reach the roof was Police Constable Sidney Miles, who was immediately killed by a shot to the head. After exhausting his ammunition and being cornered, Craig jumped 30 feet (10 metres) from the roof onto a greenhouse, fracturing his spine and left wrist.

== Trial ==
The following day, Craig and Bentley were charged with the murder of PC Miles. The doctrine of felony murder or "constructive malice" meant that a charge of manslaughter was not an option, as the "malicious intent" of the armed robbery was transferred to the shooting. From 9 to 11 December 1952 they were tried by jury before the Lord Chief Justice, Lord Goddard, at the Old Bailey in London. Christmas Humphreys, Senior Treasury Counsel, led for the prosecution.

At the time of the burglary and Miles' death, murder was a capital offence in England and Wales. The Children and Young Persons Act 1933 prevented execution of those under 18; consequently, of the two defendants, despite Craig having fired the fatal shot, only Bentley was old enough to face the death penalty if convicted. Bentley's best defence was that he was effectively under arrest when Miles was killed. Questions were also raised about how he was able to make, understand and sign his police statement.

There were three principal points of contention at trial:

Firstly, the defence claimed there was ambiguity in the evidence as to how many shots were fired and by whom. A later forensic ballistics expert cast doubt on whether Craig could have hit Miles if he had shot at him deliberately. The fatal bullet was not found. Craig had used bullets of different undersized calibres, and the sawn-off barrel made it inaccurate to a degree of six feet at the range from which he fired.

Secondly, there was controversy over the existence and meaning of Bentley's alleged instruction to Craig: "Let him have it, Chris". Craig and Bentley denied that Bentley had said the words while the police officers testified that he had said them. Another officer said that Bentley had not said the words, but his evidence was not considered. Further, Bentley's counsel argued that even if he had said the words, it could not be proven that Bentley had intended the words to mean the informal meaning of "shoot him, Chris", instead of the literal meaning of "give him the gun, Chris".

Thirdly, there was disagreement over whether Bentley was fit to stand trial at all, in light of his mental capacity. The Principal Medical Officer at Brixton was Dr. J.C.M. Matheson; he referred Bentley to Dr. Denis Hill, a psychiatrist at Maudsley Hospital. Hill's report stated that Bentley was illiterate and of low intelligence. While agreeing that Bentley was of low intelligence, Matheson was of the opinion that Bentley did not have epilepsy and was not a "feeble-minded person" under the Mental Deficiency Acts. Matheson said that he was sane and fit to plead and stand trial. English law at the time did not recognise the concept of diminished responsibility due to retarded development, though it existed in Scottish law (it was introduced to England by the Homicide Act 1957). Criminal insanity, where the accused is unable to distinguish right from wrong, was then the only medical defence to murder. Bentley, while he had a severe debilitation, was not insane.

At trial, Bentley's counsel allowed him to give evidence, during which he denied obvious facts, leading Craig's lawyer, John Parris, to call him "a lying moron".

The jury took 75 minutes to decide that both Craig and Bentley were guilty of Miles' murder, but added a plea for mercy for Bentley. Bentley was sentenced to death, while Craig was ordered to be detained at Her Majesty's Pleasure. He was released in May 1963, got married and became a plumber.

Bentley was originally scheduled to be hanged on 30 December 1952, but his execution was postponed to allow for an appeal. Bentley's lawyers filed appeals highlighting the ambiguities of the ballistic evidence, Bentley's mental age and the fact that he did not fire the fatal shot. Bentley's appeal was heard on 13 January 1953 and was unsuccessful.

== Denial of reprieve and execution ==
When his appeal was turned down, Bentley's life was placed in the hands of the Home Secretary, David Maxwell Fyfe, who had to decide whether to recommend that the Crown exercise the royal prerogative of mercy to commute his death sentence to life imprisonment. Lord Goddard forwarded the jury's recommendation of mercy, but added that he "could find no mitigating circumstances".

Maxwell Fyfe's autobiography, published in 1964, refers to the factors which he took into consideration: "the evidence of the trial, medical reports, family or other private circumstances ... and police reports, ... the available precedents, and ... public opinion". He went on to say that Bentley's case also involved the issue that it was a police officer who was killed. Maxwell Fyfe then stresses that a reprieve would mean the Home Secretary is "intervening in the due process of the law".

DC (by then Detective Sergeant) Fairfax was awarded the George Cross and PC Norman Harrison and PC James McDonald were both awarded the George Medal for their roles in the incident, whilst PC Robert Jaggs was awarded the British Empire Medal and Sidney Miles a posthumous Queen's Police Medal for Gallantry.

There was much political pressure to commute Bentley's sentence, including a memorandum signed by over 200 members of Parliament. Despite several attempts, Parliament was given no opportunity to debate the issue until after the sentence had been carried out. The Home Office also refused to grant Dr. Hill permission to make his report public.

At 9 am on 28 January 1953, Bentley was hanged at Wandsworth Prison, London, by Albert Pierrepoint, with Harry Allen assisting. There were protests outside the prison and two people were arrested and fined for damage to property.

In March 1966, Bentley's remains were removed from Wandsworth and re-interred in Croydon Cemetery.

== Posthumous pardon and quashing of conviction ==
Following the execution there was a public sense of unease about the decision, resulting in a long campaign to secure a posthumous pardon. The campaign was initially led by Bentley's parents until their deaths in the 1970s, after which the drive to clear Bentley's name was led by his sister Iris. On 29 July 1993, Bentley was granted a royal pardon, however this did not quash his conviction for murder.

On 30 July 1998, the Court of Appeal quashed Bentley's conviction for murder. Bentley's sister Iris had died of cancer the year before; her daughter, Maria Bentley-Dingwall, who was born ten years after Derek Bentley's execution, continued the campaign after her mother's death.

Christopher Craig, by then aged 62 (born May 1936), issued a statement welcoming the pardon for Bentley, stating that "his innocence has now been proved". He also apologised to the families of both PC Miles and Bentley for his actions, as well as to his own family.

Though Bentley had never been accused of attacking any of the police officers who were shot at by Craig, in order for him to be convicted of murder as an accessory in a joint enterprise it was necessary for the prosecution to prove that he knew that Craig had a deadly weapon when they began the break-in. The Lord Chief Justice, Lord Bingham of Cornhill, ruled that Lord Goddard had not made it clear to the jury that the prosecution was required to have proved Bentley had known that Craig was armed. He further ruled that Lord Goddard had failed to raise the question of Bentley's withdrawal from their joint enterprise. This would require the prosecution to prove the absence of any attempt by Bentley to signal to Craig that he wanted Craig to surrender his weapons to the police. Lord Bingham ruled that Bentley's trial had been unfair because the judge had misdirected the jury and, in his summing up, had put unfair pressure on the jury to convict. It is possible that Lord Goddard may have been under pressure while summing up since much of the evidence was not directly relevant to Bentley's defence. Lord Bingham did not rule that Bentley was innocent, merely that there had been fundamental defects in the trial process.

Another factor in the posthumous defence was that a "confession" recorded by Bentley, which was claimed by the prosecution to be a "verbatim record of dictated monologue", was shown by forensic linguistics methods to have been largely edited by policemen. Linguist Malcolm Coulthard showed that certain patterns, such as the frequency of the word "then" and the grammatical use of "then" after the grammatical subject ("I then" rather than "then I"), were not consistent with Bentley's use of language (his idiolect), as evidenced in court testimony. These patterns fit better the recorded testimony of the policemen involved. This is one of the earliest uses of forensic linguistics on record.

== Alternative theories and inconsistencies ==
In his 1971 book To Encourage the Others, David Yallop documented Bentley's psychiatric problems, as well as what he believed were inconsistencies in the police and forensic evidence and the conduct of the trial. Despite Craig's gun being the only one on the roof at the moment that Miles was shot, he proposed the theory that Miles was actually killed by a bullet from a gun other than Craig's revolver. Yallop drew this conclusion from a 1971 interview with David Haler, the pathologist who carried out the autopsy on Miles, and who estimated the head wound was from a .32-.38 calibre fired from between six and nine feet away. Craig had been firing from a distance of just under 40 feet and had used a variety of undersized .41, and .45 calibre rounds in his revolver; Yallop asserted it would have been impossible for him to use a bullet of .38 or smaller calibre. Haler did not offer in his trial evidence any estimate of the size of the bullet that had killed Miles. In July 1970, during an interview with Yallop, Craig accepted that the bullet that killed Miles came from his gun, but maintained that all of his shots were fired over the rear garden of a house adjacent to the warehouse, approximately 20 degrees to the right of Miles' location from where Craig had been firing.

The standard Metropolitan Police pistol at the time was the .32-calibre Webley Self-Loading Pistol, a number of which were issued on the night. In his book The Scientific Investigation of Crime, the prosecution's ballistics expert Lewis Nickolls stated that he recovered four bullets from the roof, two of .45, one of .41 and one of .32 calibre. The last was not entered as an exhibit in the trial, nor was it mentioned in Nickolls' evidence to the court.

When Yallop telephoned Haler the day after their initial interview, Haler reportedly confirmed his estimate of the bullet size. Shortly before the publication of Yallop's book, Haler was provided with a transcript of the interview, which Haler confirmed as accurate. After the subsequent broadcast of the BBC's Play for Today adaptation of Yallop's book, Haler denied that he had given a specific estimate of the size of the bullet that killed Miles beyond being "of large calibre". The .32 ACP bullet is not considered to be of large calibre.

Contrary to Yallop's claims, none of the police officers present was armed when PC Miles was shot. After Miles was shot and after taking Bentley to street level and putting him into a police car, Detective Constable Fairfax returned to the roof armed with a Webley & Scott .32 and fired two shots at Craig, both of which missed. Since a .32 round could not be loaded into Craig's revolver and Craig was the only armed person in the vicinity at the time of the murder, the spent .32 round could only be one of Fairfax's. As the Court of Appeal found, "Once the appellant [Bentley] had been taken down, D.C. Fairfax returned with a firearm, with which he had been issued, and went back up to the roof. He fired twice at Craig but missed, Craig having fired at him. Craig's revolver was by now empty and he jumped or dived off the roof, suffering a fractured spine, breast bone and left forearm. Notwithstanding this, he was able to tell the first police officer who reached him that he wished he had 'killed the fucking lot'. He later made a number of statements to police officers sitting with him in hospital, displaying a hatred of the police and a total lack of remorse at what he had done."

== In popular culture ==
A play Example was devised by the Belgrade Theatre in Coventry and toured Coventry schools in 1975.

The 1990 book Let Him Have It, Chris written by M. J. Trow explores the inconsistencies in the police version of events.

The 1991 feature film Let Him Have It, starring Christopher Eccleston as Bentley and Paul Reynolds as Craig, relates the story, as do the songs "Derek Bentley" by Karl Dallas, "Let Him Dangle" by Elvis Costello, "Let Him Have It" by The Bureau, and "Bentley and Craig" by Ralph McTell, whose mother was a friend of the Bentley family. The latter song was also released by June Tabor in 1997.

== See also ==
- Randall Dale Adams
- Ruth Ellis
- R v Betts and Ridley
- List of British police officers killed in the line of duty

== Cited works and further reading ==
- Berry-Dee, Christopher; Odell, Robinn (1991). Dad, Help Me Please: The Story of Derek Bentley. London: W. H. Allen. ISBN 978-1-852-27131-2.
- Heard, Brian J. (2011). Handbook of Firearms and Ballistics: Examining and Interpreting Forensic Evidence. West Sussex: John Wiley & Sons Inc. ISBN 978-1-119-96477-3.
- Hyde, H. Montgomery (ed.), Trial of Christopher Craig and Derek William Bentley, William Hodge & Co., 1954. Notable British Trials series.
- Lane, Brian (1991). The Murder Guide to Great Britain. London: Robinson Publishing Ltd. ISBN 1-854-87083-1.
- Wynn, Douglas (1996). On Trial for Murder. Pan Books. p. 205. ISBN 0-09472-990-5.
