= Trevor's World of Sport =

- Cast of Trevor's World of Sport
- Genre: Sitcom
- Written by: Andy Hamilton
- Directed by: Andy Hamilton
- Starring: Neil Pearson; Paul Reynolds; Rosalind Ayres; Abdul Salis; Cosima Shaw; Claire Skinner
- Composer: Matthew Scott
- Country of origin: United Kingdom
- Original language: English
- No. of series: 1
- No. of episodes: 7

Production
- Executive producers: Denise O'Donoghue; Jimmy Mulville
- Producer: Sue Howells
- Running time: 30 mins
- Production company: Hat Trick Productions

Original release
- Network: BBC One
- Release: 15 August – 6 October 2003

Trevor's World of Sport
- Genre: Sitcom
- Running time: 30 mins
- Country of origin: United Kingdom
- Language: English
- Home station: BBC Radio 4
- Syndicates: BBC Radio 4 Extra
- Starring: Neil Pearson; Paul Reynolds; Rosalind Ayres; Abdul Salis; Cosima Shaw; Claire Skinner
- Written by: Andy Hamilton
- Original release: 20 August 2004 – 22 February 2007
- No. of series: 3
- No. of episodes: 18
- Website: Radio 4 Extra episode guide

Trevor's World of Sport began as a 2003 BBC television sitcom written and directed by Andy Hamilton and starring Neil Pearson as Trevor. One series of the television series was made, followed by three series which were aired on BBC Radio 4, as a continuation of the television series.

== Cast ==
- Neil Pearson as Trevor Heslop
- Paul Reynolds as Sammy Dobbs
- Rosalind Ayres as Theresa
- Abdul Salis as Barry
- Cosima Shaw as Heidrun
- Michael Fenton Stevens as Ralph Renton
- Claire Skinner as Meryl

== Plot ==
The series is set in the world of TS Sports – a sports public relations firm, run by Trevor Heslop and his partner, the lascivious Sammy Dobbs (Paul Reynolds). Trevor is portrayed as an essentially decent, honest man in the corrupt money-obsessed industry of sporting celebrity, who is still deeply in love with his estranged wife Meryl (Claire Skinner). The other TS Sports office staff are the cool German receptionist Heidrun (Cosima Shaw), whose lesbianism obsesses Sammy; the young black trainee Barry (Abdul Salis); and strongly Christian office manager Theresa (Rosalind Ayres).

Andy Hamilton also appears in a minor role within the show, and several actors who have worked in his other comedy shows for television and radio appear. Neil Pearson was in Hamilton's Drop the Dead Donkey, as (briefly) was Michael Fenton Stevens who plays TS Sports' only regular client, fading celebrity Ralph Renton.

== Episodes ==
=== The television series ===
Episode	Original broadcast date
1	15 August 2003
2	22 August 2003
3	29 August 2003
4	15 September 2003 (postponed from 5 September)
5	22 September 2003 (postponed from 12 September)
6	29 September 2003
7	6 October 2003

=== The radio series ===
Series 1

Episode	Episode title	Original broadcast date
1	Jason	20 August 2004
2	Ethics	27 August 2004
3	Samantha	3 September 2004
4	Antonia	10 September 2004
5	Divorce	17 September 2004
6	Quiz	24 September 2004

Series 2

Episode	Episode title	Original broadcast date
1	Work Experience	29 November 2005
2	Dog	6 December 2005
3	Stalker	13 December 2005
4	Trust	20 December 2005
5	Marathon	27 December 2005
6	French	3 January 2006

Series 3

Episode	Original broadcast date
1	18 January 2007
2	25 January 2007
3	1 February 2007
4	8 February 2007
5	15 February 2007
6	22 February 2007

== Television rescheduling ==
Only one television series was made, and Hamilton felt mistreated by the BBC over the scheduling of the show. The first episode attracted an average of 3.4 million viewers, dropping to 2.9 million for the second and third episodes. The subsequent episodes were rescheduled from Friday evenings (just after the 9:00pm watershed) to Monday nights (after the 10:00pm news), despite the Radio Times issues having already been published listing the originally scheduled transmission dates. Hamilton went public with his displeasure over the show's scheduling and vowed never to work for BBC1 again, though he has since changed his mind. A radio version was first broadcast on BBC Radio 4 in 2004, with subsequent series in 2005 and 2007.

== DVD release ==
The complete television series was released on DVD by Acorn Media UK on 6 May 2013.
