= Follower (novel) =

Novel by Stephen Gallagher

Follower is a novel by Stephen Gallagher published in 1984.

== Plot summary ==
Follower is a novel in which an ancient demonic fylgja stalks the Teamverk survey members at working at the Tromstad mine.

== Reception ==
Colin Greenland reviewed Follower for Imagine magazine, and stated that " He keeps the gunk and gore to a bare minimum, and screws the emotional tension up tight from the first, so that you really care about the characters and their perils, supernatural and otherwise. It is the precision of his plotting and his close attention to detail that makes the horror matter."
