= Rosalind Ayres =

British actress (born 1946)

- Born: 7 December 1946 (age 79); Birmingham, Warwickshire, England
- Occupation: Actress
- Years active: 1970–present
- Spouse: Martin Jarvis (m. 1974)
- Children: 2

Rosalind Ayres (born 7 December 1946) is an English actress, director and producer. Active since 1970, Ayres is well known for her role in the 1997 film Titanic, in which she played Lucy, Lady Duff-Gordon. Her husband, Martin Jarvis, played her character's husband Sir Cosmo Duff-Gordon in the film.

== Biography ==
Ayres has appeared in numerous films and television series, including regular performances in Coronation Street (1970, as Jasmine), Armchair Thriller, Penmarric, Play for Today, The Bounder, Father's Day and Trevor's World of Sport. She has acted in and directed numerous audio plays for L.A. Theatre Works and Hollywood Theater of the Ear.

Ayres appeared on the BBC One semi-improvised sitcom Outnumbered as Gran in series 3 (2010) for the episodes "The Family Outing" and "The Internet". She returned as Gran in the first episode of series four (2011) named "The Funeral". Ayres also appeared in the Christmas special in 2012.

In addition to her film and television work, in 2011, Ayres provided voice and motion capture work for Katherine Marlowe, the main antagonist of the video game Uncharted 3: Drake's Deception, opposite Nolan North, Richard McGonagle and Graham McTavish. Together with her husband, Ayres runs the radio production company Jarvis & Ayres Productions, producing and directing plays and serials for BBC Radio 4.

Ayres also played the character of Iris in the comedy sitcom Kate & Koji, a customer in the café who regularly consulted the doctor on various ailments. It aired in April 2020, and she appeared in three episodes. In September 2022, Ayres appeared alongside her husband in an episode of the BBC soap opera Doctors as Ellie Chilton.

== TV and filmography ==
Year	Title	Role	Notes
1972	Home and Away	Grace	
1973	That'll Be The Day	Jeanette	
1973	The Lovers!	Veronica	
1974	From Beyond the Grave	Prostitute – Edward's first victim	Segment 1 "The Gate Crasher"
1974	Little Malcolm	Ann Gedge	
1974	Stardust	Jeanette	
1974	Shoulder to Shoulder	Maisie Dunn	1 episode: "Outrage"
1974	Father Brown	Christabel	"The Head of Caesar"
1974	Coronation Street	Judy Cookson / Alison Wright / Jasmine	Soap opera
1974	Public Eye	Mrs Grant	TV series
1974	Within These Walls	Rowena Patterson	Series 1, Episode 10 - "Guessing
1975	Affairs of the Heart	Millie	Episode 9
1976	Laurence Olivier Presents: Hindle Wakes	Fanny Hawthorn	Directed by Laurence Olivier
1976	The Slipper and the Rose	Isobella	
1980	Cry Wolf	Maria Moore	
1980	The Gentle Touch	Frances West	
1980	Agony	Ward Sister	
1981	Only When I Laugh	Amy Glossop	TV sitcom
1982	The Bounder	Mary Mountjoy	TV sitcom
1984	The Weather in the Streets	Etty	TV film
1985	Juliet Bravo	Linda Markham	
1992	Emily's Ghost	Mama	
1994	Black Beauty	Mistress Gordon	
1996	Police Story 4: First Strike	Australian Group #1	
1997	Titanic	Lady Duff Gordon	
1998	Gods and Monsters	Elsa Lanchester	
1998	Heartbeat	Ann Marsden	Episode: “For Better or Worse”
1998	Midsomer Murders	Doreen Anderson	Episode: “Faithful unto Death”
1999	Beautiful People	Nora Thornton	1999 “ Sabrina The Teenage Witch - Aunt Dorma
2001	Christmas in the Clouds	Mabel	
2003	Trevor's World of Sport	Theresa	TV sitcom
2004	Steamboy	Edward Steam, voice	English version
2005	Age of Empires III	Queen Elizabeth, voice	Video game
2010–2012	Outnumbered	Gran	Semi-improvised sitcom; Series 3 (episodes 1–2); Series 4 (episode 1); Christmas Special 2012
2011	Uncharted 3: Drake's Deception	Katherine Marlowe, voice	Video game
2017	Hampstead	Susan	
2020	Kate & Koji	Iris	
2022	Doctors	Ellie Chilton	Episode: "Mustn't Grumble"
