= Eleventh Hour (American TV series) =

- Genre: Police procedural; Mystery; Drama
- Based on: Eleventh Hour by Stephen Gallagher
- Starring: Rufus Sewell; Marley Shelton; Omar Benson Miller
- Theme music composer: Harry Gregson-Williams
- Opening theme: Eleventh Hour Theme
- Composer: Graeme Revell
- Country of origin: United States
- No. of seasons: 1
- No. of episodes: 18

Production
- Executive producers: Jerry Bruckheimer; Jonathan Littman; Danny Cannon; Cyrus Voris; Ethan Reiff; Paul Buccieri; Mick Davis
- Producer: Matthew Carlisle
- Production location: Los Angeles, California
- Running time: 44 minutes
- Production companies: Jerry Bruckheimer Television; Granada America; Warner Bros. Television

Original release
- Network: CBS
- Release: October 9, 2008 – April 2, 2009

Related
- Eleventh Hour

Eleventh Hour is an American science-based drama television series, which is based on the 2006 British series of the same name. The series was a joint venture between Jerry Bruckheimer Television, Granada America and Warner Bros. Television. The series ran on CBS for one season from October 9, 2008 to April 2, 2009.

== Plot ==
Eleventh Hour follows Dr. Jacob Hood (Rufus Sewell), a brilliant biophysicist and Special Science Adviser for the FBI who is brought in to investigate crimes of a scientific nature that other agents may be unable to solve. Hood is the government's last line of defense, and it is his mission to keep scientific advances out of the hands of those with nefarious intentions. Special Agent Rachel Young (Marley Shelton), of the FBI's executive protection detail, is assigned to protect Hood. Both Dr. Hood and Special Agent Young are assisted by Special Agent Felix Lee (Omar Benson Miller), towards the end of the series.

== Cast and characters ==
- Rufus Sewell as Dr. Jacob Hood – a science adviser to the FBI, called in to investigate crimes that may have a scientific explanation. Even though Hood is extremely brilliant, he sometimes gets lost in his own thoughts, and this, coupled with his low attention span and poor social skills, causes him to be viewed as odd. He also has few instincts of self-preservation or danger, causing him to often do things that put his life in jeopardy, such as standing in front of a fleeing suspect's car to get the license plate, something that frequently annoys Rachel. Additionally, he does not know how to drive well, leading Rachel to insist she do all the driving. Hood appears to be an atheist and is knowledgeable on a number of scientific, mathematical and philosophical topics. He nursed his wife, who died of cancer, throughout her illness.
- Marley Shelton as FBI Special Agent Rachel Young – Hood's handler. Though she is employed to protect his life, she has also said that her job is "to protect him from himself" – something he makes very difficult for her. Hood might annoy her from time to time but she does care about his well-being, viewing his many techniques with a kind of exasperated affection, though she is frequently embarrassed by and for him. Rachel mainly gets annoyed when he gets too caught up in an investigation and does something stupid, or when he does things like accidentally sit on his panic button. It is noted throughout the series that Dr. Hood is her only friend, though male characters frequently flirt with her. She is the latest in a line of Hood's protectors, but she refuses to let him "drive her away like he did those others."
- Omar Benson Miller as FBI Special Agent Felix Lee (episodes 14–18) – introduced later in the series when he asks (although it is later discovered that he begged) to help Jacob Hood on a case. After solving the case, he asks to work with Hood full-time, stating that the work they do is amazing. Felix is given the job and works as somewhat of a scout, helping out the team with heading to the location and gathering the material they need by the time Hood and Young get there. Though he likes the job, Felix feels underappreciated due to the lack of praise for the amount of work he does.

== Production ==
=== Development ===
The original ITV version ran for four 90-minute episodes. Before the American remake series premiered, CBS ordered 13 one-hour episodes. The pilot episode was produced with a budget of four million dollars, and the remaining episodes were given approximately two million dollars each. Despite shooting "Agro" as a second possible pilot, CBS premiered the series with its original $4 million pilot, "Resurrection", instead.

=== Cancellation ===
Despite the series averaging in and around the top 20 series on broadcast television and ending up one of the top new shows of the season, the show was canceled on May 19, 2009, not for its overall ratings, but the show unable to retain as much of the CSI audience lead-in in a way acceptable to CBS executives and programmers. Upon learning of Eleventh Hour's cancellation, a small core group of fans banded together to form the Eleventh Hour Resurrection Campaign in an unsuccessful attempt to encourage the show's production companies to shop the series to another network, though Jerry Bruckheimer's long-term relationship with CBS made that unlikely to occur in any event.

== Episodes ==
No.	Title	Directed by	Written by	Original release date	Prod. code	U.S. viewers (millions)
1	"Resurrection"	Danny Cannon	Teleplay by : Mick Davis	October 9, 2008	276037	11.59
Local police in Seattle find 19 aborted fetuses in the course of a crime investigation. Dr. Hood and Agent Young arrive to investigate the possibility that the fetuses have been cloned, a fact which is proven by finding all the fetuses have identical DNA. They discover a young woman has been impregnated with fetus #20, and a plot possibly funded by a billionaire business man who lost his only son years before. The man who was hired to get rid of the aborted fetuses finally shows Dr Hood and Agent Young the warehouse where the women were taken to be impregnated in a small temporary procedure room but they find it abandoned. He also tells them that the woman in charge called "Gepetto" on the phone to talk about what was happening and receive instructions. The young pregnant woman ends up in the hospital bleeding and they discover she has a condition that will cause her and the baby to die if she goes into labor. The hospital reports this to the police when the woman escapes and disappears from the ICU. Dr Hood confronts the billionaire with one of the fetuses and forces him to realize that he can't bring his son back and they finally learn the young woman has been taken to a recently abandoned clinic. They arrive to find another woman performing CPR on the pregnant woman and Dr Hood starts to assist while Agent Young goes to find blood to transfuse into the dying woman. The woman who works for Gepetto attacks Agent Young but ends up being knocked out. Meanwhile, Dr Hood discovers that the woman who is performing CPR actually is Gepetto and she walks out, leaving him to try to save the young woman alone.
2	"Cardiac"	Clark Johnson	Mick Davis	October 16, 2008	3T7702	12.04
Several 11-year-old boys die of heart attacks.
3	"Agro"	Danny Cannon	Heather Mitchell	October 23, 2008	3T7701	12.16
Hood investigates several cases of food-related paralysis in northern California.
4	"Savant"	Terry McDonough	Ildy Modrovich	October 30, 2008	3T7704	11.48
Several autistic teens are kidnapped.
5	"Containment"	Danny Cannon	Adam Targum	November 6, 2008	3T7703	10.97
A mysterious disease threatens Pittsburgh, PA.
6	"Frozen"	Karen Gaviola	André Bormanis	November 13, 2008	3T7705	11.60
A series of mysterious deaths by way of freezing the person solid plagues the Western coast of the US.
7	"Surge"	Guy Ferland	Story by : Fred Golan; Teleplay by : Angel Dean Lopez	November 20, 2008	3T7706	10.67
A government experiment, in which US troops were subject to inhumane tests, goes awry in Nevada.
8	"Titans"	Nick Gomez	Speed Weed	December 4, 2008	3T7707	10.91
College students are dying from the bends.
9	"Flesh"	David M. Barrett	Ben Lee	December 11, 2008	3T7708	13.43
College students, in Miami, suffer from flesh-eating bacteria.
10	"H2O"	Terry McDonough	Story by : Kim Newton; Teleplay by : Heather Mitchell	January 15, 2009	3T7709	15.52
While investigating outbreaks of violence in Texas, Hood becomes affected as well.
11	"Miracle"	Paul Shapiro	Mick Davis (teleplay) (British episode: "Miracle"); Simon Stephenson	January 22, 2009	3T7710	12.32
A young boy's cancer is miraculously cured after he drinks from a mineral spring.
12	"Eternal"	Jeffrey Hunt	Ildy Modrovich	January 29, 2009	3T7711	12.71
Hood investigates a millionaire with two fully developed hearts who has congenital heart disease.
13	"Pinocchio"	Guy Ferland	Angel Dean Lopez	February 12, 2009	3T7712	11.04
Hood investigates a cloning operation and suspects that Geppetto may be back.
14	"Minamata"	Dermott Downs	Adam Targum	February 19, 2009	3T7713	11.23
A helicopter pilot goes blind during a live televised traffic report and dies when the helicopter crashes. Hood tracks down the mysterious poison before other people go blind. A new member of the team helps with the investigation. Omar Benson Miller joins the cast as Special Agent Felix Lee.
15	"Electro"	Nick Gomez	Story by : André Bormanis; Teleplay by : Heather Mitchell	February 26, 2009	3T7714	11.73
Hood is called to investigate when 30 people are killed by lightning during a storm that lasts only 10 minutes.
16	"Subway"	Paul McCrane	Stephen Gallagher	March 5, 2009	3T7715	12.15
Doctor Hood is called in to determine the cause of a poison cluster, which is killing people in Philadelphia.
17	"Olfactus"	Paul Shapiro	Angel Dean Lopez & Ildy Modrovich	March 12, 2009	3T7716	11.78
Four homicides during fashion week due to sudden fits of rage lead to Doctor Hood being asked to investigate.
18	"Medea"	Guy Ferland	Stephen Gallagher	April 2, 2009	3T7717	10.38
The Deputy Director of the FBI is accused of stealing a woman's child and Dr. Hood is the only one who believes her.

== Home media ==
Warner Brothers released the complete series on DVD in Region 1 on October 20, 2009 via their Warner Archive Collection. This is a Manufacture-on-Demand (MOD) release and is available through Warner's online store and Amazon.com. The series is also available online as a pay-per-episode offering on Vudu and Amazon Video.

== Reception ==
=== Critical ===
Eleventh Hour debuted after CSI at 10:00 but at 11.6 million viewers retained only 50% of CSI's audience. The show came in second in its timeslot after the premiere of Life on Mars. Although Life on Mars lost 27% of its audience in its second week, Eleventh Hour gained numbers and saw a further gain in its third week, leading CBS to increase its script order. On December 2, 2008, TV Guide reported that CBS has ordered five additional scripts bringing the series’ total number of episodes to 18. On Rotten Tomatoes, Eleventh Hour has an aggregate score of 35% based on 6 positive and 11 negative critic reviews. The website's consensus reads: "A cardboard cut-out drama that fails to wow, Eleventh Hour relies too heavily on formula and not enough in its star power."

The Biotechnology Industry Organization launched a blog, EleventhHourFacts.com, which features subject matter experts discussing the scientific basis of each episode through video interviews, live episode blogging and posts.

=== Ratings ===
Season	Timeslot (EST)	Premiere	Finale	Viewers (in millions)	Rank
1	Thursday 10:00 PM	October 9, 2008	April 2, 2009	12.11	22

- Seasonal rankings (based on average total viewers per episode) of Eleventh Hour.
- Each US network television season starts in late September and ends in late May, which coincides with the completion of May sweeps.
