= All Good Things (TV series) =

BBC television series

- Genre: Comedy drama
- Written by: Lesley Bruce
- Directed by: Sharon Miller
- Starring: Brenda Blethyn; Warren Clarke; Timothy Stark; Paul Reynolds; Deborah Findlay; Ken Stott; Celia Imrie; John Lynch; Ron Pember; Jemma Redgrave
- Composer: Bill Connor
- Country of origin: United Kingdom
- Original language: English
- No. of series: 1
- No. of episodes: 6

Production
- Producer: Lynn Horsford
- Running time: 50 minutes
- Production company: BBC

Original release
- Network: BBC1
- Release: 14 May – 18 June 1991

All Good Things is a BBC's six-part comedy-drama series that aired on BBC1 from 14 May to 18 June 1991, starring Brenda Blethyn and Warren Clarke.

== Episodes ==
1. "The Blessing" (14 May 1991)
2. "The Suicide" (21 May 1991)
3. "Reading Lessons" (28 May 1991)
4. "The Flat" (4 June 1991)
5. "The Trip North" (11 June 1991)
6. "Marriage Guidance" (18 June 1991)

== Cast and characters ==
Actor	Character
Brenda Blethyn	Shirley Frame
Warren Clarke	Phil Frame
Timothy Stark	Paul Frame
Paul Reynolds	Anthony Frame
Ken Stott	Lawrence Wilson
Deborah Findlay	Doll
Celia Imrie	Rachel Bromley
John Lynch	Vincent Gibney
Ron Pember	Victor Wilson
Jemma Redgrave	Elaine Wilson

== Media releases ==
The complete series of All Good Things on DVD in a 2-disc set was released by Simply Media on 28 November 2016.
