= Oktober (TV series) =

- Genre: Thriller
- Written by: Stephen Gallagher
- Directed by: Stephen Gallagher
- Starring: Stephen Tompkinson; Lydzia Englert; Maria Lennon; James McCarthy; James Duke; Michael Bertenshaw; Stephen Jenn; Richard Leaf
- Composer: Alan Parker
- Country of origin: United Kingdom
- Original language: English
- No. of series: 1
- No. of episodes: 3

Production
- Executive producer: Brian Eastman
- Producers: Stuart Doughty; Ted Morley
- Cinematography: Bruce McGowan
- Editor: Andrew McClelland
- Running time: 150 minutes
- Production company: Carnival Film & Television

Original release
- Network: ITV
- Release: 2 April – 16 April 1998

Oktober is a three-part British television psychological thriller, written and directed by Stephen Gallagher, that first broadcast on ITV on 2 April 1998. Based upon Gallagher's 1988 novel of the same name, the series stars Stephen Tompkinson as Jim Harper, a schoolteacher who finds himself drawn into an international conspiracy when a pharmaceutical company eyeball him to be the human guinea pig in a new, state-of-the-art medical trial.

Tompkinson told the Daily Mirror that he was keen to take on the more active role of Jim Harper, commenting; “I grabbed this project because I’d never been asked to do anything like this before, and the chance to do stunts was one reason it was so appealing. As soon as I read the script I knew there hadn’t been anything like this on British television for a very long time. It has elements of The 39 Steps running through it. It asks how an ordinary person manages to deal with a set of quite extraordinary events.”

The series was released on Region 2 DVD on 24 May 2004. A reprint of Gallagher's novel with Tompkinson on the cover art followed on 2 January 2018.

== Production ==
The series was initially developed for producer Kevin Loader as a BBC2 drama, but when the channel commissioner declined to greenlight the project writer Stephen Gallagher took it to Carnival Films. From there producer Brian Eastman offered it to ITV Drama Controller Nick Elliot. During filming in the Swiss Alps, a number of crew members suffered from altitude sickness, which temporarily halted production.

The series was intended for broadcast in February 1998, with a number of listings magazines including features on the series prior to broadcast; but due to changes in ITV scheduling the series did not transmit until early April.

== Technical ==
Though photographed by feature cinematographer Bruce McGowan on Super-16 negative in a 16:9 aspect ratio, ITV Drama's then-reluctance to commit fully to widescreen broadcasting resulted in the episodes and subsequent DVD releases being cropped to suit the older screen size. The series has since been repeated on ITV2 but the uncropped version has yet to be released.

== Cast ==
- Stephen Tompkinson as Jim Harper
- Lydzia Englert as Rochelle
- Maria Lennon as Linda
- James McCarthy as Viveros
- James Duke as Daniel
- Michael Bertenshaw as Dr. Franks
- Stephen Jenn as Russian
- Richard Leaf as Bruno
- Lisa Jacobs as Dr. Bauer
- Michael N. Harbour as Werner
- James Kerr as Stephen
- Tim Poole as Terry
- Hermione Gulliford as Kim
- Billy McColl as Billy

== Episodes ==
No.	Title	Directed by	Written by	Original release date
1	"Episode 1"	Stephen Gallagher	Stephen Gallagher	2 April 1998
2	"Episode 2"	Stephen Gallagher	Stephen Gallagher	9 April 1998
3	"Episode 3"	Stephen Gallagher	Stephen Gallagher	16 April 1998
