= Crusoe (TV series) =

Adventure-drama television series

- Intertitle
- Genre: Drama; Adventure
- Created by: Stephen Gallagher
- Starring: Philip Winchester; Tongayi Chirisa; Joaquim de Almeida; Mía Maestro; Sam Neill; Anna Walton; Sean Bean
- Composers: James Seymour Brett; James Gelfand
- Countries of origin: Canada; United Kingdom; United States; South Africa
- Original language: English
- No. of seasons: 1
- No. of episodes: 13

Production
- Executive producers: Stephen Greenberg; Jean Bureau; Justin Bodle; Michael Prupas; Chris Philip; Jeff Hayes
- Running time: 45 minutes
- Production companies: Power; Muse Entertainment Enterprises (as Muse Entertainment); Moonlighting Films; Universal Media Studios; Incendo Productions

Original release
- Network: NBC (United States); Five (United Kingdom); Citytv (Canada)
- Release: October 17, 2008 – January 31, 2009

Crusoe is an adventure-drama television series, based loosely on the 1719 novel Robinson Crusoe by Daniel Defoe. The series' 13 episodes aired on NBC from October 17, 2008, to January 31, 2009, during the first half of the 2008–09 television season. It follows the adventures of Robinson Crusoe: a man who has been shipwrecked on an island for six years and is desperate to return home to his wife and children. His lone companion is Friday, a native whom Crusoe rescued and taught English.

== Cast ==
- Philip Winchester as Robinson Crusoe

He has been shipwrecked on the island for the past six years, and desperately desires to return to his wife and children, whom he left back in England. He goes on the voyage to the new world after he is wrongly accused of being a part of a rebellion against the crown, due in part to the dark intentions of those he believes are his friends.

As the series progresses, more information is revealed about how he became shipwrecked in the form of flashbacks and cutaways. Allowed to develop away from the bonds of 17th Century life and possessing a talent for things mechanical, the ingenious Crusoe builds a breath-taking and altogether modern home high up in the trees to elude his enemies. He appears in 12 of 13 episodes.

- Tongayi Chirisa as Friday

He becomes Crusoe's companion after he is rescued from being a human sacrifice for the tribe of cannibals he was once a part of. Friday is well skilled and knowledgeable, but still feels as though he is an embarrassment to his father. While Crusoe recognizes Friday's wisdom and courage as more than equal to his own, visitors to the island mistake Friday for Crusoe's slave, and are unwilling to see past the color of his skin and simply refer to him as a "savage". He appears in 12 of 13 episodes.

- Joaquim de Almeida as Santos Santana

He is the Captain of the Spanish Guard who was originally an enemy of Crusoe and Friday. Santana is disgusted by Crusoe's respect for Friday, and makes a deal with his prisoners in order to obtain a treasure buried on the island. However, he appears to have turned over a new leaf after he is captured by cannibals and befriends Friday's father. After escaping the cannibals, he risks his life to save someone he once believed to be a savage, and sustains life-threatening injuries. He appears in 3 of 13 episodes.

- Mía Maestro as Olivia

She disguises herself as a young man in order to serve as an assistant physician on an English merchant ship. After the crew mutinies, the ship becomes damaged and the crew makes camp on the island, where Olivia encounters Crusoe and Friday while bathing and out of her disguise. She often helps Crusoe with medical emergencies, and agrees to help Crusoe restore the Captain to power. However, she begins to develop romantic feelings for Crusoe, who remains faithful and in love with his wife. She appears in 7 of 13 episodes.

- Sam Neill as Jeremiah Blackthorn

He is a friend (at least he claims to be) of the Crusoe family who takes an interest in Robinson's affairs. He agrees to lend the family money in exchange for being named godfather to Crusoe's two children. As the series progresses, it becomes clear that Jeremiah's interest in the Crusoe family is for his own gain. Jeremiah's deceased brother from whom he inherited his fortune is actually the biological father of Robinson Crusoe. He is then not the rightful heir to the Blackthorn fortune, instead it is Robinson Crusoe who should be the rightful heir. He appears in 11 of 13 episodes.

- Anna Walton as Susannah Crusoe née Tuffley

She is a childhood friend of Crusoe's whom he later married. Like Crusoe, she lost her mother at a young age, and was raised solely by her father. However, her family is much more wealthy than the Crusoes, which makes most of her family hostile towards her husband. Her brother convinces Crusoe to make a financial deal with him, and seizes all of his funds once Crusoe leaves on his voyage, forcing Susannah to seek refuge in the home of Jeremiah Blackthorn. She refuses to believe that Crusoe is dead, despite being told otherwise. He appears in 12 of 13 episodes.

Other characters include James Crusoe (Sean Bean), Samuel Tuffley (Mark Dexter), Nathan West (Kieran Bew), Mary Crusoe (Emma Barnett), Captain Lynch (Jonathan Pienaar), Judy (Georgina Rylance), Will Atkins (Jeremy Crutchley), Cleric (James Middlemarch), Nolan Moore (Sean Michael), John Tuffley (Terence Harvey), Judge Jefferies (Joss Ackland), Fenwick (Bob Goody), and Captain Taylor (Danny Keogh).

== Production ==
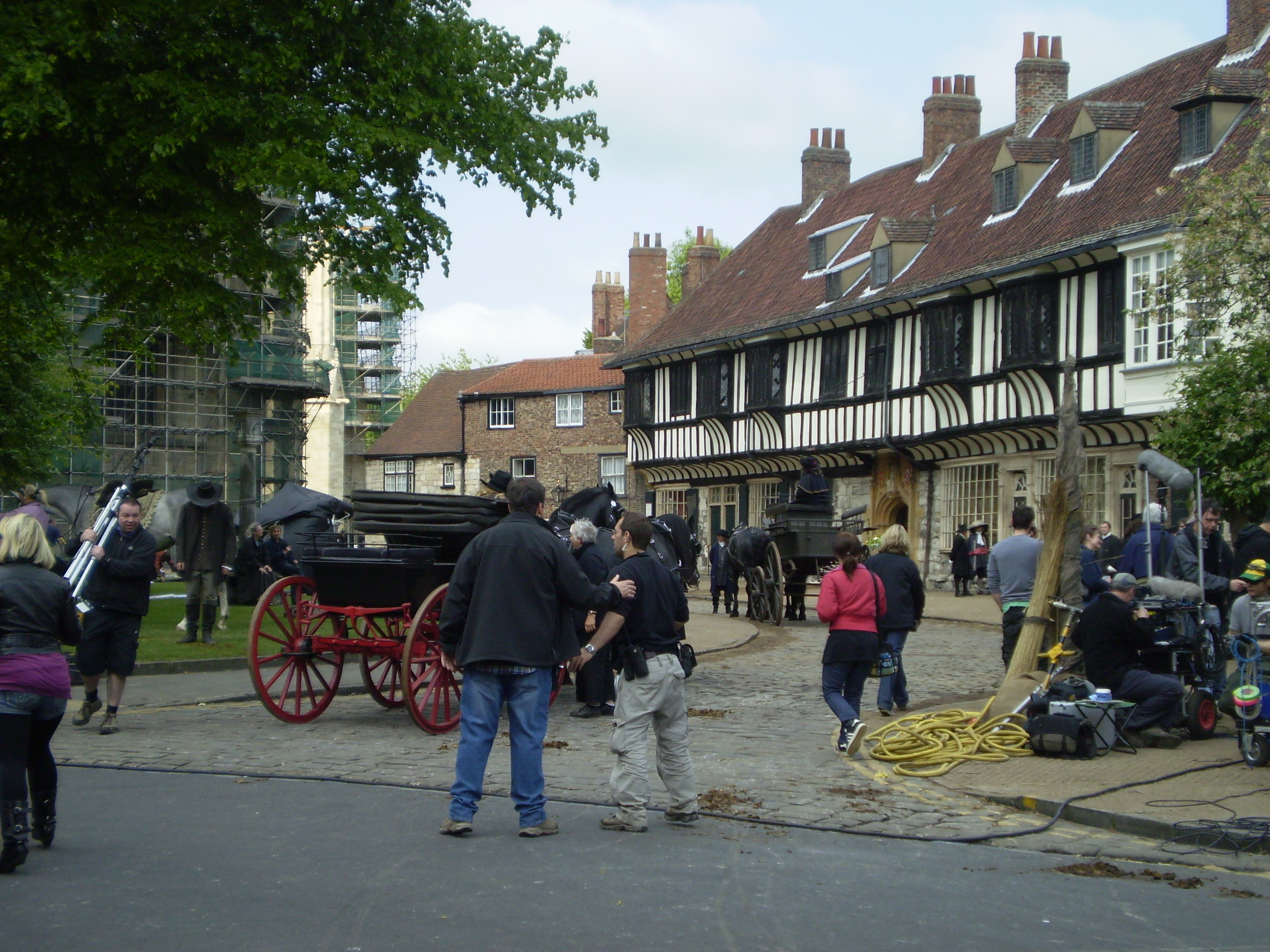
Crusoe filming at College Street, York

The show was made by the independent, London-based production company, Power, for the NBC network and was a co-production by Power, Moonlighting in South Africa, and Muse Entertainment in Canada. Power has claimed this is the first time a US network "commissioned a British supplier for nearly 40 years". Justin Bodle is the executive producer for Power, with Michael Prupas executive producer for Muse Entertainment and Genevieve Hofmeyr for Moonlighting. Other executive producers are Jeff Hayes, Stephen Greenberg and Jean Bureau. The series format has been developed for television by British writer Stephen Gallagher with a writing staff that includes Andrew Rattenbury, Debbie Oates, Nick Fisher and James Moran.

=== Filming ===
Filming began in York, England in May 2008 with an estimated budget of £17 million. Exterior footage was shot around York in location including St William's College, The Shambles, St. Leonard's hospital, the River Ouse, and York's Guildhall. Scenes were also shot in Whitby, North Yorkshire on the replica frigate the Grand Turk. In early June filming moved to the North Yorkshire Moors using the backdrop of the Ryedale Folk Museum, in Hutton-le-Hole. Other filming locations for the series are the Garden Route in South Africa and the Seychelles.

== Episodes ==
No. in series	Title	Directed by	Written by	Original air date
1–2	"Rum and Gunpowder"	Duane Clark	Stephen Gallagher	October 17, 2008
Robinson Crusoe, the only survivor of a shipwreck, and his trusty companion Friday, a native whose life he saved, find themselves in danger when a group of pirates land on the island. They are searching for a legendary treasure, and the daughter of the pirate who buried the treasure, Judy, threatens to kill Crusoe unless he acts as a guide to the island. Friday, thought dead, pursues the pirates in order to rescue his friend. The situation goes from bad to worse when the Spanish Guard, led by Captain Santana, lands on the island and joins forces with the pirates whom they have been sent to arrest.
3	"Sacrifice"	Jeff Woolnough	Avrum Jacobson	October 24, 2008
Friday has an unusual dream about a young woman whose spirit is lost and yearning for the sea. While Friday believes this is significant, Crusoe is skeptical, and instead focuses his attention on fixing the water source to the tree house. However, Crusoe loses his wedding ring, and in the process of trying to retrieve it from the spring, discovers a temple to a water goddess with evidence that a woman was sacrificed on the island. Chased by a group of wild dogs, Crusoe and Friday journey through the jungle in an attempt to discover the truth and set her spirit free, as well as recover the symbol of Crusoe's marriage.
4	"The Mutineers"	Michael Robison	Andrew Rattenbury	October 31, 2008
After a merchant ship lands on the island, Crusoe and Friday discover that it has been taken control of by a group of mutineers. Crusoe contemplates forming an alliance with the ship's trapped captain in hopes that he can provide him with a means to return to England. Captain Taylor agrees, and they plan to kill the leader of the mutineers, Jacob, so that the rest of the crew will no longer serve him under fear. While planning their attack, they come across the ship's physician's assistant, Oliver, who is actually a woman disguised as a young man. However, she quickly proves that she is more than a match for any man who crosses her.
5	"High Water"	Jeff Woolnough	James Moran	November 7, 2008
Crusoe and Friday come across a washed up boat and compass while passing through the jungle. While they repair the boat, Friday accidentally drops the compass into the camp fire, melting the needle. Crusoe and Friday then set out to steal a compass from the mutineers on the island, and discover that Atkins has been keeping track of the tides. As they make their exit, they run into Olivia, who helps them escape after Atkins and his men return to the camp. While running from the mutineers, Friday falls into a sinkhole and is trapped by a tree, making Crusoe choose between saving his friend's life and reaching the boat before the tides wash it away.
6	"Long Pig"	Michael Robison	Nick Fisher	November 14, 2008
Friday deals with demons from his past as the cannibals return to the island to sacrifice two new captives. Crusoe, unable to stand by, decides to rescue the captives. They are initially only able to rescue one, but they aren't thrilled when it is revealed to be Captain Santana of the Spanish Guard. However, Santana claims he has turned over a new leaf, and refuses to leave the island until the other captive is rescued. Crusoe and Friday are shocked to learn that the other Captive is Friday's father, Baillom, who has befriended Santana while they were imprisoned together.
7	"Bad Blood"	Alex Chapple	Debbie Oates	November 21, 2008
Crusoe goes to find Olivia after Friday attacks him, suffering from delusions from what he believes to be a snake bite. Not convinced by Crusoe's diagnosis, Olivia determines that he had actually ingested some poisoned honey, but there is one problem: The cure is a rare plant that only grows on cliffs. Olivia insists on accompanying Crusoe to retrieve the plant, and they set out on a desperate attempt to retrieve the cure for Friday, who is quickly falling deeper into madness. Through it all, Crusoe is determined not to betray Friday, whom he credits with saving his life, and Friday's accusing him of being a traitor brings painful memories from Crusoe's past to the surface.
8	"Heroes & Villains"	Michael Robison	Cameron McAllister	December 6, 2008
Olivia informs Crusoe that the mutineer's ship has been fixed, and he must think of a new plan to get on it and off the island. He discloses a new strategy to Captain Taylor and his wife, the later of whom feels guilty about her prior treatment of Friday, and the former agrees to grant Crusoe passage to England. However, fresh problems are encountered, and Captain Taylor's first mate betrays him, Olivia is caught in the crossfire when the mutineers attacks Crusoe and Friday at the treehouse, and someone's attempt to find redemption causes more problems than it remedies.
9	"The Name of the Game"	Helen Shaver	Jack Lothian	December 20, 2008
Haunted by the memory of seeing another boy being attacked by a crocodile, Friday is unable to try to pass the final test as a child, and believes that his father is ashamed of him. Years later, Friday becomes annoyed with Crusoe after he claims that the academic challenges he faced were tougher than the physical ones Friday faced. Friday and Crusoe use Friday's childhood challenges as a competitive tool, and Friday begins to lash out at Crusoe when he doesn't take the trials seriously. But after an unlucky accident, Friday is once again forced to face the challenge he could not bear to do as a child in order to save his friend's life.
10	"Smoke and Mirrors"	Alex Chapple	Debbie Oates	January 10, 2009
Crusoe is overjoyed--and somewhat mystified--when Susannah appears on the island, claiming that she came ashore from a ship that has come to rescue him. Unable to remember the events that lead to this point, Crusoe must journey across the island to the cliffs in order to reach the ship and discover what transpired after mounting a flag as a signal for a rescue. Susannah is intent on helping him find his lost memories, but may be more aware of what is going on than she lets on. Soon, both of their lives are in danger after Crusoe realizes that there is someone else residing on the island.
11	"The Hunting Party"	Helen Shaver	Rohan Gavin	January 17, 2009
A former king of a neighboring tribe of Friday's arrives on the island and sends three warriors to hunt down Crusoe. Friday tries to protect his friend, but ends up developing an attraction to the sole female warrior of the group. Throughout the hunt, Crusoe and Friday are reminded of those they encountered previously on the island. Meanwhile, in England, Santana has contacted Susannah over Crusoe's whereabouts, but she is reluctant to believe his lavish story. However, Jeremiah is more inclined to believe him, as his shady plans begin to fall into place. At the same time, Olivia returns to England and her life as a woman, intent on delivering Crusoe's message to Susannah.
12	"The Traveler"	Michael Robison	Stephen Gallagher	January 24, 2009
Crusoe and Friday are startled after a rescue ship arrives off the coast of the island. Upon reaching the beach, they find a shipwrecked lifeboat, and save the sole survivor from being drowned by the current, whom they later discover to be Jeremiah Blackthorn. Crusoe is overcome with joy and gratitude, but Friday isn't convinced that Blackthorn's intentions are pure. Reading Friday's claims as a misunderstanding, Crusoe encourages Friday to spend time with Blackthorn and get to know him. Back in England, Olivia rescues Susannah from the mental institution Blackthorn placed her in, and they set out to discover Blackthorn's true intentions.
13	"The Return"	Michael Robison	Stephen Gallagher	January 31, 2009
In the series finale, Crusoe and Friday defend themselves against Blackthorn and his men. After Blackthorn fails to capture the duo, he sets out to retrieve the Crusoe bible from the tree house, for it contains the only proof that Crusoe is the rightful heir of Blackthorn's fortune. Crusoe, shocked by the discovery of Blackthorn's true intentions, vows to get revenge, and demands information from Samuel Tuffley after cornering him in a sword fight. Back in England, Olivia helps Susannah search for her children, who are being abused at an orphanage where Blackthorn abandoned them. Blackthorn bargains with Crusoe; destroy the proof and allow Friday to be killed in exchange for passage to England. Crusoe attacks, but discovers the crew of the ship to be infected with Blackpox, and he and Friday abandon their attempt - leaving them stranded on the island.

=== Broadcast history ===
The series premiered in the United States in the fall (September/October) of 2008. NBC ran a heavy promotion campaign during its screening of the Beijing Summer Olympic Games. The show has been sold to other countries including Canada. The two-hour series premiere aired on October 17, 2008, at 8pm, on NBC and Citytv in Canada and originally aired on Friday nights. However, beginning in December 2008, the show moved to Saturdays, due to low ratings. The show was named one of the five worst new television shows in TelevisionWeek’s semiannual Critics Poll.

Crusoe was initially promoted as a regular TV show but, after the first few episodes aired (with poor ratings), the network listed it as a "high-action, fast-paced, thirteen-part series."

In the UK, Crusoe premiered with a double-bill on FTA Terrestrial Channel Five on 20 December 2008. It was then played daily during the holiday period for the full 13 episodes.

In Vietnam, it was aired on VTC7-Today TV from April 26 to June 7, 2009.

== Ratings ==
#	Episode	Air date	Viewers (m)
1.01 / 1.02	Rum and Gunpowder	10-17-08	7.38
1.03	Sacrifice	10-24-08	6.09
1.04	The Mutineers	10-31-08	4.09
1.05	High Water	11-7-08	4.20
1.06	Long Pig	11-14-08	4.23
1.07	Bad Blood	11-21-08	3.56
1.08	Heroes & Villains	12-06-08	2.4
1.09	The Name of the Game	12-20-08	2.4
1.10	Smoke and Mirrors	01-10-09	2.8
1.11	The Hunting Party	01-17-09	2.7
1.12	The Traveler	01-24-09	2.89
1.13	The Return	01-31-09	3.12

== Awards ==
"Rum and Gunpowder", the first episode of the series, won the 2009 Golden Reel Award for Long Form Sound Effects and Foley in Television. It was also nominated for the 2009 Gemini Award for Best Original Music Score for a Program or Series.
