= Maisie Raine =

UK TV series (1998–1999)

- Poster
- Genre: Crime drama
- Created by: Stephen Bill
- Directed by: Rob Evans; Claire Winyard; David Innes Edwards; Bob Mahoney
- Starring: Pauline Quirke; Ian McElhinney; Steve John Shepherd; Rakie Ayola; Richard Graham; Brian Bovell; Paul Reynolds; Dean Lennox Kelly
- Composer: Andrew Phillips
- Country of origin: United Kingdom
- Original language: English
- No. of series: 2
- No. of episodes: 12

Production
- Executive producers: Tessa Ross; Irving Teitelbaum
- Producers: Ian Strachan; Liz Watkins
- Production location: London
- Cinematography: Colin Munn
- Editor: William Webb
- Camera setup: Single-camera setup
- Running time: 50 minutes
- Production company: Fair Game Films

Original release
- Network: BBC One
- Release: 28 July 1998 – 9 July 1999

Maisie Raine is a British television crime drama series, first broadcast on BBC One, that ran from 28 July 1998 to 9 July 1999. Pauline Quirke stars as the eponymous title character, an unorthodox detective whose hands on yet down-to-earth approach is not always appreciated by her superiors. Created by Stephen Bill, a total of twelve episodes were broadcast across two series. The first series features a running story arc involving Maisie's wayward brother Kelvin (Paul Reynolds), and had a much lighter feel than the second, which featured grittier storylines including drug dealing, armed robbery, arson and murder.

Throughout the series, Maisie is portrayed as a strong and dedicated detective, often stepping on toes and bending the rules to get results, and even becoming personally involved with the victims of each case. She often clashes with her superior officer, Jack Freeman (Ian McElhinney), who also appears to hold a romantic torch for her, while George Kyprianou (Steve John Shepherd), a junior constable on her team, often proves to be her best ally in the field. Maisie also receives help from her loyal housekeeper Joan (Stella Moray). Although neither series has been released on DVD, repeats of the series are regularly shown on Drama and Alibi.

== Cast ==
- Pauline Quirke as DI Maisie Raine
- Ian McElhinney as DCS Jack Freeman
- Anna Patrick as DCI Susan Askey (Series 1)
- Richard Graham as DS Mickey Farrel
- Rakie Ayola as DC Helen Tomlin
- Steve John Shepherd as DC George Kyprianou
- Brian Bovell as DC Stephen Holmes (Series 1)
- Dean Lennox Kelly as DC Chris Mallory (Series 2)
- Paul Reynolds as Kelvin Raine (Series 1)
- Stella Moray as Joan Hobson (Series 2)

== Episodes ==
=== Series overview ===
Series	Episodes	Originally released	
Series	Episodes	First released	Last released
1	6	28 July 1998	1 September 1998
2	6	4 June 1999	9 July 1999

=== Series 1 (1998) ===
No.	Title	Directed by	Written by	Original release date	Viewers (millions)
1	"Happy Families"	Rob Evans	Stephen Bill	28 July 1998	8.07
Maisie is furious to be recalled from holiday to investigate a brutal assault of a young man, found severely injured in the middle of an empty football ground.
2	"Food of Love"	David Innes Edwards	Jo O'Keefe	4 August 1998	6.60
Maisie and the team investigate a brutal assault on a pensioner, but find that the local community have erected a wall of silence to stall the investigation.
3	"Go Bananas"	Rob Evans	Shaun Duggan	11 August 1998	6.77
Maisie investigates when a popular television host claims that he is the victim of a stalker, but as the case begins to unravel, it appears he could have been faking it all along.
4	"An Ordinary Little Tragedy"	David Innes Edwards	Gillian Richmond	18 August 1998	6.78
Maisie deals with a complex case involving the disappearance of a young girl, who was threatening to desert her immigrant family and return home to her native country.
5	"Getting to Be a Habit"	Claire Winyard	Stephen Tredre	25 August 1998	6.57
Maisie reluctantly accepts to investigate when her brother, Kelvin, is robbed and money is taken. However, the case appears to be less straightforward than she first thought.
6	"A Blast from the Past"	Claire Winyard	Stephen Bill	1 September 1998	5.51
Maisie tries to talk down a suicidal woman from jumping to her death, but finds herself drawn into an unsolved murder from six years previously.

=== Series 2 (1999) ===
No.	Title	Directed by	Written by	Original release date	Viewers (millions)
1	"Can't See For Looking"	Bob Mahoney	Stephen Bill	4 June 1999	6.68
Maisie becomes concerned that George is becoming too involved with his latest informant, but the new trainee inspector takes things a step further by putting her life at risk when he bungles a surveillance operation on a major drug dealer who is also possibly implicated in a murder.
2	"European Forty-Five"	Bob Mahoney	John Milne	11 June 1999	6.48
Maisie and the team investigate an armed robbery at an off-licence, but discover that possible local witnesses have been scaremongered into keeping quiet.
3	"ID"	Claire Winyard	John Milne	18 June 1999	7.03
Maisie tackles a series of murders connected to local drug gangs, but is forced to contend with an outbreak of gang warfare. Meanwhile, Tomlin loses her warrant card and is forced to explain herself when it is used for criminal purposes.
4	"Old Scores"	Claire Winyard	Neil McKay	25 June 1999	6.19
Maisie investigates the firebombing of a home belonging to a former police officer, and immediately suspects an ex-convict, who he helped to convict, who has recently been released from prison.
5	"The Witness"	Rob Evans	John Milne	2 July 1999	6.23
Maisie comes to the aid of a man who is forced to smuggle illegal immigrants and alcohol into the country by a pair of loan sharks whom he owes £2,000 to.
6	"To Sleep..."	Rob Evans	Stephen Bill	9 July 1999	6.63
Maisie is forced to juggle two particularly complex cases, investigating the disappearance of a police officer's son, and an organised gang stealing valuable cars to order from a hotel car park.
