= Eleventh Hour (British TV series) =

- US DVD release artwork
- Genre: Crime drama Thriller
- Created by: Stephen Gallagher
- Starring: Patrick Stewart; Ashley Jensen
- Country of origin: United Kingdom
- Original language: English
- No. of series: 1
- No. of episodes: 4

Production
- Executive producer: Andy Harries
- Producers: Ken Baker; Stephen Smallwood
- Running time: 90 minutes
- Production company: Granada Television

Original release
- Network: ITV
- Release: 19 January – 9 February 2006

Related
- Eleventh Hour

Eleventh Hour (originally titled Dark Matter) is a four-part British television series developed by Granada Television for ITV, created by writer Stephen Gallagher.

== Plot ==
The show follows the adventures of Professor Ian Hood (originally Alan Hood), played by Patrick Stewart, a Special Advisor to the government's Joint Sciences Committee, who troubleshoots threats stemming from or targeting "scientific endeavour." He is joined by Rachel Young, played by Ashley Jensen, a Special Branch operative who acts primarily as his bodyguard, as Hood has made powerful enemies through his work. The first episode was broadcast on 19 January 2006.

== Cast ==
- Patrick Stewart as Professor Ian Hood
- Ashley Jensen as DS Rachel Young, Special Branch operative

== Production ==
When Eleventh Hour went into pre-production in April 2005, it raised considerable interest and media attention, both because of Stewart's involvement and the budget allocated to the series by ITV, which was reportedly around £4.5 million. Gallagher, himself a two-time writer for Doctor Who, made the distinction that Eleventh Hour will be "science-based," not science fiction or speculative fiction.

=== Changing crew ===
Material was added to the scripts by producer Simon Stephenson after the early episodes went into production, and creator Stephen Gallagher left his role on the series because of it. Gallagher claimed that the reason behind his departure was because his essentially "science-based crime-drama" had unwanted sci-fi material written into it without his consent. The subject matter and direction of the later stories appear to differ from synopses that were originally announced in April 2005.

== Episodes ==
No.	Title	Directed by	Written by	Original release date	Viewers (millions)
1	"Resurrection"	Terry McDonough	Stephen Gallagher & Simon Stephenson	19 January 2006	5.04
After the discovery of a large number of malformed fetuses in a field, Ian Hood (Patrick Stewart) and Rachel Young (Ashley Jensen) are called in to help with the police investigation to find the perpetrator. Hood thinks that the discovery is the latest act of 'Gepetto', an unidentified culprit responsible for a black market human cloning experiment across Eastern Europe. Young befriends a cocky DS, Doug Cook (Jack Pierce), who provides her and Hood with confidential information on the case. Hood interrogates the caretaker of the farm where the fetuses were found, and his questioning leads him to discover a makeshift laboratory and delivery suite on an industrial estate, being run by a doctor who was struck off from the medical register nine months ago for malpractice. Hood suspects that a local businessman, Peter Gifford (Clive Wood), devastated at the death of his son, may be behind the operation. DS Cook gets a call to say that a 19-year-old mother, Kelly Fox (Joanna Horton), has been admitted to a local hospital. They suspect she is the latest surrogate for Gepetto (Jane Lapotaire). Hood faces a race against time to save the young girl from harm, whilst bringing his prime suspect to justice.
2	"Containment"	Terry McDonough	Stephen Gallagher & Simon Stephenson	26 January 2006	N/A
The discovery of the decomposed body of excavator Christopher Fisher in a church construction site leads the police to suspect an outbreak of the plague, having stemmed from the rotten bodies discovered beneath the church floor. Hood, however, realises that it is more serious. He and colleague Martin Callan (Nicholas Woodeson), order the site's excavation staff to be quarantined. Junior staff member Ned (Michael Begley), who is desperate to attend his son's fifth birthday party, breaks out of the quarantine, forcing Hood and Young to give chase. Meanwhile, tests on Fisher's body show that he was infected with a hybrid of Smallpox and Tanapox viruses. Hood realises that he was infected long before working on the site. Young discovers that Fisher was moonlighting at a funeral home, where he came into contact with a factory engineer who fell to his death while repairing a refrigeration system. Tests show the engineer was also infected with the virus. The trail leads the team to a hostel where a number of illegal Chinese workers from the factory are living. However, it soon transpires that factory owner Ellis Gibson (Jack Deam) is harbouring a dangerous secret.
3	"Kryptos"	Roger Gartland	Stephen Gallagher, Simon Stephenson & Mike Cullen	2 February 2006	N/A
Hood is called upon to help an old friend, Richard Adams (Donald Sumpter), who has been sacked from the Institute of Environmental research due to his increasingly erratic behaviour. Company boss Destrano (Tom Mannion) is glad to see the back of Adams, worried that if his 'flawed' research were to be leaked, it could have a damning effect on the institute's reputation. As Adams continues to try and get his research into print, Hood meets one of his colleagues, Martin Godley, who claims that Adams' research was intriguing and possibly the tip of a major environmental iceberg. When Adams later disappears, suspected of having committed suicide, Hood tries to decrypt an encoded file sent to him by Adams. Meanwhile, Godley is killed in a suspicious hit-and-run accident, and Hood suspects that a serial killer - linked to Destrano - is trying to silence anyone connected with Adams' research. As Hood begins to crack the code, Young follows clues which lead her to suspect that Adams is still alive. But with Destrano's hitmen now on the trail of both men, it becomes a race against time to get the research into print - before it is lost forever.
4	"Miracle"	Roger Gartland	Stephen Gallagher & Simon Stephenson	9 February 2006	4.27
Following the miraculous cure of a young boy who is suffering from cancer, Hood and Young travel to his home town to investigate claims that he has been cured by local spring water, just as the area becomes a focal point for cancer sufferers desperately seeking a cure. When they start to experience even worse symptoms, Hood becomes convinced there must be something in the water. However all the tests prove negative, and it appears increasingly likely that the boy's surgeon, Dr. Williams (Clare Holman), has made the entire story up. But shortly after Hood reaches this conclusion, Williams is found dead in a nearby reservoir, having been the victim of an apparent suicide. A chance phrase in the suicide note referring to a Geiger Counter, a term Williams would never use due to Hans Geiger's known Nazi sympathies, leads Hood to investigate her death. He uncovers a Government conspiracy to produce heavy water, which he is able to demonstrate is found in the spring. By blackmailing a leading government figure, Drake (Roy Marsden), Hood clears Williams' name, but is unable to expose the secret service's involvement in the affair.

== Home media ==
The complete series was released on Region 1 DVD on 26 September 2006. It was re-released on 24 May 2016 with new cover artwork, additional features and subtitles.

== Remakes ==
An American remake, produced by Jerry Bruckheimer and starring Rufus Sewell as Hood (now known as Jacob Hood), aired on CBS from 2008 to 2009. American actress Marley Shelton co-starred as FBI Special Agent Rachel Young. The series aired on Thursdays at 10 pm (ET/PT). The remake was a joint venture between Jerry Bruckheimer Television, Granada Television International and Warner Bros. Television.
