= The Governor (British TV series) =

British television drama series (1995–1996)

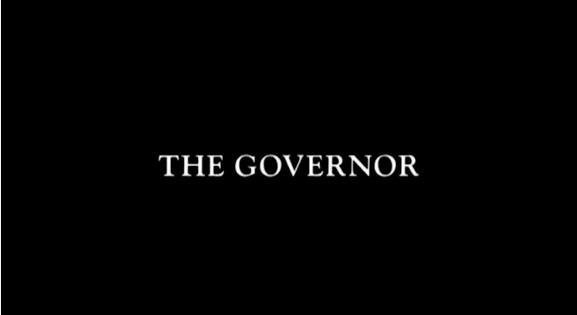
- Genre: Crime drama
- Created by: Lynda La Plante
- Starring: Janet McTeer; Derek Martin; Ron Donachie; David Nicholls; Christine Moore; Sophie Okonedo; Jeremy Sheffield; Eamonn Walker; Paul Kynman; Adrian Scarborough; Craig Charles
- Country of origin: United Kingdom
- Original language: English
- No. of series: 2
- No. of episodes: 12

Production
- Executive producers: Steve Lanning; Keith Richardson (Series 2)
- Producers: Lynda La Plante; Liz Thorburn
- Running time: 45—100 minutes
- Production companies: La Plante Productions; Yorkshire Television

Original release
- Network: ITV
- Release: 14 May 1995 – 27 April 1996

The Governor is an ITV television drama series that began in 1995 and ended in 1996, with just two series being broadcast. It was devised and written by Lynda La Plante, known for her hit television series Prime Suspect, which went on hiatus in the same year.

Each episode is forty-five minutes long, with the exception of the first episode which was double-length. La Plante felt that the series had reached a natural end and decided not to write any further episodes, therefore the last episode was broadcast on 27 April 1996, and ended with a cliffhanger that was not resolved. The series starred Janet McTeer and Derek Martin as prisoner governors Helen Hewitt and Gary Marshall. The second season was shot in Ireland at various locations around Dublin including Wheatfield prison. The complete first series was released on DVD on 28 March 2011. The complete second series was released on 4 June 2012.

== Cast ==
=== Prison officers ===
- Janet McTeer as Governor Helen Hewitt
- Derek Martin as Deputy Governor Gary Marshall
- Ron Donachie as Officer Russell Morgan
- David Nicholls as Officer "Jumbo" Jackson
- Paul Kynman as Officer James Mallahide (Series 1)
- Idris Elba as Officer Donny Chiswick (Series 2)
- John Forgeham as Temporary Governor Ronald Wrexham (Series 2)

=== Prison inmates ===
- Eamonn Walker as Snoopy Oswald
- Terry O'Neill as Victor Braithwaite/Tarzan
- Adrian Scarborough as Walter Brinkley (Series 1)
- Anthony Higgins as Norman Jones (Series 1)
- Robert Cavanah as Anthony Kelly (Series 1)
- Tim Meats as Alan Fisher (Series 1)
- Ian Curtis as Howard Webster (Series 1)
- Craig Charles as Eugene Buffy (Series 2)

=== Other prison staff ===
- Christine Moore as Mavis O'Connell
- Sophie Okonedo as Moira Levitt (Series 1)
- Jeremy Sheffield as Dr. Thomas (Series 1)
- John Blakey as Dr. Cameron Williams (Series 2)

== Episodes ==
Each episode of The Governor is generally sixty minutes long, however episode one of the first series was a feature-length episode, running for 102 mins. A total of twelve episodes of The Governor have aired to date. The list is ordered by the episodes' original air dates.

=== Series 1 (1995) ===
| No. | Title | Directed by | Written by | Original release date |
|---|---|---|---|---|
| 1 | "Episode 1" | Alan Dossor | Lynda La Plante | 14 May 1995 |
Feature-length episode. Helen Hewitt (Janet McTeer), deputy of a women's prison in London, is asked to join the investigation team after a riot at the notorious Barfield prison, during which a prisoner, Michael Winchward, was found dead, with the cause being suspected suicide. After showing her skills and enthusiasm, following the forced retirement of the last governor, Hewitt is asked to be the new governor of Barfield, much to the dismay of second-in-command Gary Marshall (Derek Martin). When the outcome of the investigation concludes that Winchward committed suicide, Hewitt conducts a personal investigation, convinced that he was murdered and his murder covered-up. Meanwhile, in an effort to start-afresh, with contractors rebuilding the remains of the A and B wings following the riots, Hewitt embarks on a plan to rid Barfield of drugs once and for all, whilst using the leverage gained to extract information from the prisoners regarding Michael Winchward's murder.
| 2 | "Episode 2" | Alan Dossor | Lynda La Plante | 21 May 1995 |
High risk prisoner Maynard (Nicholas Ball) returns from trial having been found guilty of murder. However, his stay at Barfield is short lived, when he and a fellow inmate manage to escape during exercise, using a helicopter as a getaway vehicle. Meanwhile, with Marshall still on leave, Hewitt is furious when another prisoner, Webster, manages to flee from two officers whilst being accompanied to a dental appointment. With the press having a field day, and Barfield having been allocated £60m for the refurbishment, Hewitt becomes determined not to let the situation escalate any further. However, an incident involving some stolen property soon gets out of hand, resulting in two prisoners becoming involved in a brawl, with one slashing the face of the other with a razor blade. With Hewitt at her wits' end, a late night drive along a country lane proves to be more than she bargained for, when she comes across escaped prisoner Webster, still running after fleeing from his dentist appointment hours earlier.
| 3 | "Episode 3" | Robert Knights | Lynda La Plante | 28 May 1995 |
Still reeling after the aftermath of the two prisoners' escape, Hewitt informs the team that all procedures must be undertaken thoroughly from now on, with no corners to be cut. Two new prisoners arrive at Barfield – Jones, who has been found guilty of murder, and Kelly, who pleaded guilty to bank fraud. Kelly is placed on D wing with two fellow prisoners, one of whom, Foster (Jake Wood) is having some trouble with some fellow prisoners, who have accused him of being a nonce. Whilst association is taking place, they enter his cell and stage a pretend trial for his crimes against 'noncing', however the prank goes horribly wrong, and Foster is hung with a piece of rope from an air vent, causing instant death. With Kelly a witness to the crime, he goes into silence in order to protect himself. Meanwhile, prisoner Brinkley is causing havoc on C wing, after announcing he is on hunger strike when his radio is confiscated during a search of prisoner's personal possessions, when it is found in a fellow inmate's cell.
| 4 | "Episode 4" | Robert Knights | Lynda La Plante | 4 June 1995 |
The trial of the four prisoners involved in Colin Foster's death gets underway, but when asked to take the witness stand, Anthony Kelly changes his story and lies to protect the three prisoners involved in Foster's death. Braithwate, the main antagonist, also provides a false story, denying all of the evidence against him. As the legal representatives of those involved begin to squabble amongst themselves in an attempt to uncover the truth, Foster's parents look on forlorn, wanting to know the truth behind their son's brutal and violent death. Subsequently, all four are found guilty and are sentenced to between six and eleven years extra each, to be served on top of their existing sentence. Meanwhile, Hewitt interviews a number of potential new staff members, and a social appointment between Hewitt and Dr. Thomas (Jeremy Sheffield) is interrupted when prisoner Jones takes officer Morgan hostage in his cell, and several other staff members have to step in to stop Jones from harming Morgan.
| 5 | "Episode 5" | Bob Mahoney | Lynda La Plante | 11 June 1995 |
Prisoner Fisher is granted home leave, but fails to inform Hewitt that his wife has requested a divorce, thus breaking the rules of the home leave agreement. To make matters worse, Fisher returns in a police car after a woman who has broken down on the motorway reports him when he approaches her to ask for help in getting back to the prison. A number of new staff members begin working at Barfield, but racial tensions appear to rear their ugly head near enough from the off when officer Mallahide takes an instant disliking to one of the new coloured officers, Andrews.Hewitt attempts to defuse the racial tensions. Meanwhile, a new psychologist catches the eye of prisoner Jones, who offers to help her build up the new prison library. All seems well, until he is asked to return to the wing, when he catches Mallahide off guard and assaults him multiple times, resulting in a broken nose. Dr. Thomas subsequently discovers that Jones has not been taking his medication, causing him to behave erratically.
| 6 | "Episode 6" | Bob Mahoney | Lynda La Plante | 18 June 1995 |
With the big-wigs prepared for a full inspection of Barfield, Hewitt has 48 hours to clean up all of Barfield's little problems. However, these turn out to be the worst 48 hours possible, with prisoner Fisher taking his own life in his cell, prisoner Braithwaite being stabbed with a chisel of wood by a fellow prisoner during showers, a mysterious intake of alcohol finding its way into the prison and onto the wing, and the impromptu beating of prisoner Jones by a number of prison staff. After hauling Marshall over the coals for not being on duty, Hewitt is informed by Dr. Thomas that Marshall's wife is suffering from terminal cancer. And just when Hewitt thought it couldn't get any worse, prisoner Snooper disguises himself as a prison officer and attempts to escape with prisoner Kelly. Helen decides that there is no choice but sweep all of her problems aside and present Barfield as the best she can, in the imminent situation of the arrival of another 250 prisoners to the newly refurbished A and B wings.

=== Series 2 (1996) ===
| No. overall | No. in series | Title | Directed by | Written by | Original release date |
|---|---|---|---|---|---|
| 7 | 1 | "Episode 1" | Bob Mahoney | Lynda La Plante | 23 March 1996 |
Having left her position of governor at Barfield, Hewitt is called back to assist with a hostage situation when one of the inmates, George Fuller, takes officer Morgan (Ron Donachie) hostage in his cell. The new governor, Keller, is soon forced to hide the fact that he was on the golf course when the hostage situation began when he should have been on duty. Reacquainting herself with deputy governor Marshall, Hewitt uses her hostage negotiation techniques to secure Morgan's release to safety. As Marshall immediately sets up a vote of no confidence petition against Keller, and the pending investigation into the actions taken on the day of the siege uncovers several of Keller's weaknesses, he subsequently resigns as governor. Meanwhile, Victor Braithwaite (Terry O'Neill) returns to the wing after being seconded to another prison, but has since changes his name by deedpoll to 'Tarzan'. Immediately, it soon begins to dawn on the team how dangerous Braithwaite may actually be.
| 8 | 2 | "Episode 2" | Bob Mahoney | Lynda La Plante | 30 March 1996 |
Prisoner Buffy (Craig Charles) ends up in a brawl with prisoner Smith when he uses all of the credit on his phone card to make an unnecessary call. Marshall has trouble trying to keep prisoner Braithwaite contained following an attack on a fellow inmate. Meanwhile, Hewitt is offered the job as head of psychology at Barfield, a job which she subsequently declines, knowing full well that the job of governor is ready and waiting for the right applicant. Meanwhile, rehearsals for the prison musical are well underway, with Boffy leading the main chorus. However, an exchange between prisoners Smith and Snoopy becomes the catalyst for a horrific scene, when Snoopy accidentally inhales uncut cocaine, which brings out an unexpected rage during which he attacks and rapes a member of prison staff. Hewitt is subsequently asked to defuse the situation, during which, she discovers that she has been given the role of permanent governor at Barfield, much to the delight of Marshall and the team.
| 9 | 3 | "Episode 3" | Aisling Walsh | Lynda La Plante | 6 April 1996 |
A prisoner hatches a plot to escape and goes with his wife to the Lake District. Helen is told by the police that they have a tip off, and he is recaptured in Leeds. After breaking a chair over an officer's head, he gets a beating and is sent to the hospital wing. Helen begins an inquiry into whether one of her own officers beat him up.
| 10 | 4 | "Episode 4" | Aisling Walsh | Lynda La Plante | 13 April 1996 |
Helen begins to look into the incident of the escaped prisoner. She interviews other prisoner and the prisoner is attacked. It is 'proven' that the officers attacked in self-defence, and the prisoner decides not to press charges – else his life in prison would be awful for the next eleven years. He meets Victor Braithwaite and asks him if he can be involved in whatever he is planning against the officers.
| 11 | 5 | "Episode 5" | Robert Knights | Lynda La Plante | 20 April 1996 |
Victor Braithwaite carries out his plan and takes Officer Morgan hostage and holds him inside a cell at knife point. He makes demands and Helen tries to talk to him, but the prisoner inside the cell with him gets a kicking when he tries to release Morgan and Braithwaite refuses to allow either of them out of the cell. Brian falls down the stairs fleeing from the guards and injures his skull, he is then transferred to the hospital ward and gets sodomized.
| 12 | 6 | "Episode 6" | Robert Knights | Lynda La Plante | 27 April 1996 |
Officer Morgan returns from his home-leave after the hostage situation. Helen leaves the prison on a training course and the prisoners plan their biggest escape attempt yet. Whilst the majority of prisoners are watching a show put on by staff and other prisoners a prisoner holds wing officers hostage. Governor Helen Hewitt returns to the prison as the prisoners are escaping, police are also on scene as prisoner Eugene Buffy discharges his shotgun from the prison wall. Armed Police shoot Buffy and as he lies on the floor Governor Hewitt calls for them to hold their fire as she approaches a wounded Buffy, he then reaches for his gun and shoots Governor Hewitt. It is unclear whether she survives.
