= Fred Fairfax =

British police officer

Frederick William Fairfax GC (17 June 1917, Westminster, London – 23 February 1998, Yeovil) was a British police detective awarded the George Cross for his heroism in chasing the armed robbers Derek Bentley and Christopher Craig on 2 November 1952. The pair had broken into a warehouse in Croydon and were pursued by Fairfax onto the roof of the building. Fairfax grabbed Bentley then Craig shot him, grazing his shoulder. Despite his injury, the unarmed Fairfax chased Bentley and managed to arrest and subdue him. More officers arrived at the scene and Constable Sidney Miles scaled the roof, to be shot dead by Craig, who then jumped from the roof after expending his ammunition, injured himself upon landing, and was arrested, then later charged with PC Miles's murder.

The award of the medal was announced in the London Gazette of 6 January 1953, as were the George Medals awarded to Police Constables Norman Harrison and James McDonald. Police Constable Robert Jaggs was given the British Empire Medal and Police Constable Miles was posthumously awarded the Queen's Police Medal for Gallantry.

In January 1953 Fairfax was transferred to duties in the West End of London. Fairfax made a full recovery from his injuries and was promoted to Detective Sergeant on the day that he was awarded the GC. He retired from the police force in April 1962 after nearly 26 years of service. He ran a tobacco and sweet shop before selling the business to set up his own private investigations agency. Fairfax Investigators Ltd, which proved a success; it was sold in 1980. He retired to Dorset, where he was an active Freemason. Fairfax was a boxer in his youth, and in retirement became a boxing judge.

Frederick Fairfax died in Yeovil on 23 February 1998, just a few months before Bentley’s conviction and death sentence for the murder of Police Constable Miles were posthumously quashed.
