= Rayner Goddard, Baron Goddard =

British judge (1877–1971)

The Right Honourable The Lord Goddard GCB PC

Lord Chief Justice of England
- In office 21 January 1946 – 30 September 1958
- Monarchs: George VI; Elizabeth II
- Preceded by: The Viscount Caldecote
- Succeeded by: The Lord Parker of Waddington

Lord of Appeal in Ordinary
- In office 19 July 1944 – 21 January 1946
- Preceded by: The Lord Atkin

Personal details
- Born: William Edgar Rayner Goddard. 10 April 1877 Notting Hill, Middlesex, England
- Died: 29 May 1971 (aged 94) Temple, London, England
- Spouse: Marie Schuster (m. 1906; died 1928)
- Children: 3
- Education: Trinity College, Oxford
- Occupation: Barrister

William Edgar Rayner Goddard, Baron Goddard, GCB, PC (10 April 1877 – 29 May 1971) was Lord Chief Justice of England from 1946 to 1958, known for his strict sentencing and mostly conservative views despite being the first Lord Chief Justice to be appointed by a Labour government, as well as the first to possess a law degree. Goddard's no-nonsense reputation was reflected in a number of nicknames that he acquired, which included: "The Tiger", "Justice-in-a-jiffy", and – from Winston Churchill – "Lord God-damn". He is considered one of the last hanging judges.

== Early life and career ==
William Edgar Rayner Goddard was born on 10 April 1877 at Bassett Road, Notting Hill, London, the second of three sons and the third of five children of the solicitor Charles Goddard (22 February 1843 – 27 May 1922) and his wife Janet née Jobson, who was from Sheffield (1851 – 8 June 1934). He went by his third name Rayner throughout his life.

Goddard attended Marlborough College, where he decided on a career in law. In later life he vigorously denied the frequent claims of Lord Jowitt that he had amused his school contemporaries by reciting, word for word, the form of the death sentence upon those whom he disliked. He later attended Trinity College, Oxford and graduated with a second-class degree in jurisprudence in 1898, and gained a Blue in athletics. He was called to the Bar by the Inner Temple in 1899.

On 31 May 1906 Goddard married Marie Schuster, the daughter of the banker Sir Felix Otto Schuster, with whom he was to have three daughters. She died on 16 May 1928 during an operation at the age of 44. Goddard never remarried.

Goddard built a strong reputation in commercial cases on the Western Circuit and was appointed as Recorder (a part-time judgeship) of Poole in 1917. Goddard was appointed a King's Counsel in 1923, transferred to be Recorder of Bath in 1925, and eventually Recorder of Plymouth in 1928. He was elected a Bencher of his Inn in 1929 and undertook work for the Barristers' Benevolent Association. In the general election of 1929, Goddard agreed, against his better judgement, to contest the Kensington South constituency as an unofficial Conservative candidate. The sitting Conservative MP, Sir William Davison, had been a defendant in a divorce case, and a local committee thought the newly enfranchised young women voters would refuse to support him. In the end, Goddard, running under the slogan "Purity Goddard", came last in the poll, winning only 15 per cent of the vote, and the sitting member was returned.

== Judicial appointment ==
On 5 April 1932 Goddard was appointed a Judge of the High Court and assigned to the King's Bench Division, receiving the customary knighthood later that year. As a judge of the first instance, Goddard acquired a good reputation as a commercial judge, who conducted trials with efficiency and had little tolerance for dilatory practices.

In 1938, the Administration of Justice (Miscellaneous Provisions) Act authorised the appointment of three additional Lords Justices of Appeal: Goddard was one of the three new Lords Justices appointed under the Act, after only six years in the High Court. During the Second World War, he also sat as a supplementary judge in the King's Bench Division. In 1943, he conducted a Home Office inquiry into the use of corporal punishment by Hereford magistrates, later known as the "Hereford birching inquiry".

Goddard was known for turning out well-argued and legally convincing judgments. He would deliver stern diatribes to criminals, but his sentences were usually moderate, even when he was personally offended by the crime. After another six-year stint, he was appointed as a Lord of Appeal in Ordinary upon the death of Lord Atkin in 1944 and received a life peerage. He chose the title Baron Goddard of Aldbourne in the County of Wiltshire.

== Lord Chief Justice ==
Viscount Caldecote, the Lord Chief Justice of England and Wales, suffered a stroke in 1945 and suddenly resigned, creating a vacancy at an inopportune moment. The tradition was for the appointment to be a political one, with the Attorney-General stepping up to take it. However, Sir Hartley Shawcross was unwilling and considered too young. The appointment of a stop-gap candidate was expected. As Goddard explained in an August 1970 interview with David Yallop: "They had to give the job to somebody. There wasn't anybody else available, so Attlee appointed me." At the time Attlee and Goddard did not know each other.

The appointment, in January 1946, came at a time when the crime rate, and public concern over crime, were both increasing. Through his judgments, Goddard made it clear that he felt that stronger sentences were the way to tackle both. However, Goddard was also known to give young offenders probation rather than custodial sentences, if he believed that they would respond.

Despite his appointment as a stop-gap, Goddard served twelve and a half years as Lord Chief Justice before stepping down in September 1958.

=== Drunk drivers ===
On 5 December 1950 Goddard said that in most cases drunk drivers should be jailed.

=== ID cards ===
In June 1951, Goddard ruled in Willcock v Muckle that giving police the power to demand an ID card "from all and sundry, for instance, from a lady who may leave her car outside a shop longer than she should", made people resentful of the police and "inclines them to obstruct the police instead of to assist them." Therefore, for the police to demand that individuals show their ID cards was unlawful because it was not relevant to the purposes for which the card was adopted. ID cards, in force since the start of World War II, were abolished in February 1952.

=== Craig and Bentley ===
In December 1952 Goddard presided over the trial of Christopher Craig and Derek Bentley, accused of the murder of PC Sidney Miles at a Croydon warehouse on 2 November 1952. Sixteen-year-old Craig had shot and killed PC Miles while resisting arrest on the roof of a factory he intended to break into. Bentley, who was 19 but of limited intelligence, had accompanied him and was accused of urging Craig to shoot, having called out to him, "let him have it, Chris", when a policeman, Sgt Frederick Fairfax, asked Craig for the gun. Fairfax was wounded by Craig.

Lord Goddard directed the jury at the trial that, in law, Bentley was as guilty of firing the shot as Craig, even though there was contradictory evidence as to whether Bentley was aware that Craig was carrying a gun. During the trial, Goddard made no reference to Bentley's mental state, apart from when Christmas Humphreys asked Bentley to read a statement he had allegedly made to police officers after his arrest. Goddard told Humphreys that Bentley could not read.

After 75 minutes of deliberations, the jury returned a guilty verdict in respect of both defendants. Craig was too young for a death sentence, but Bentley was not. Nevertheless, the jury had exceptionally returned a plea of mercy in favour of Bentley along with the guilty verdict. The decision passed to the Home Secretary, David Maxwell Fyfe, to decide whether clemency should be granted. After reading Home Office psychiatric reports and a petition signed by 200 MPs, he rejected the request and Bentley was hanged by Albert Pierrepoint on 28 January 1953. Craig was detained at Her Majesty's pleasure and released in 1963 after serving ten-and-a-half years. Bentley's conviction was quashed in July 1998 with the appeal trial judge, Lord Bingham of Cornhill, noting that Lord Goddard had denied Bentley "the fair trial which is the birthright of every British citizen."

=== Political context ===
Goddard chose to continue his involvement with trials on the front line, and opted to judge ordinary High Court cases as he was entitled to do.

He presided over the libel trial at which Harold Laski, Chairman of the Labour Party, attempted unsuccessfully to sue the Daily Express for damages when it quoted him as saying that the party must take power "even if it means violence". On 13 June 1965, Goddard told Laski's brother, Neville Laski, "I didn't agree with the findings of the jury. I have always been unhappy about the case and I often think about it. I can say it has been on my conscience. I want to add that your brother was not a good witness. He couldn't answer simple yes or no when questioned and made long speeches. Slade was no match for Pat Hastings".

In 1948 backbench pressure in the House of Commons forced through an amendment to the Criminal Justice Bill to the effect that capital punishment should be suspended for five years and all death sentences automatically commuted to life imprisonment. The Bill also sought to abolish judicial corporal punishment in both its then forms, the cat-o'-nine-tails and the birch. Goddard attacked the Bill in the House of Lords, making his maiden speech, saying he agreed with the abolition of the "cat" but not birching, which he regarded as an effective punishment for young offenders. He also disagreed with the automatic commutation of death sentences, believing that it was contrary to the Bill of Rights.

In a debate, he once referred to a case he had tried of an agricultural labourer who had assaulted a jeweller; Goddard gave him a short two months' imprisonment and twelve strokes of the birch because "I was not then depriving the country of the services of a good agricultural labourer over the harvest". The suspension of capital punishment was reversed by 181 to 28, and a further amendment to retain the birch was also passed (though the Lords were later forced to give way on this issue). As the crime rate continued to rise, Goddard became convinced that the Criminal Justice Act 1948 was responsible as it was a "Gangster's Charter". He held a strong belief that punishment had to be punitive in order to be effective, a view also shared at the time by Lord Denning.

=== Heraldic case ===
In 1954, Lord Goddard sat for the only case the High Court of Chivalry had heard since 1737.

=== Bodkin Adams case ===
During the committal hearing of John Bodkin Adams on a charge of murder in January 1957, Goddard was seen dining with Sir Roland Gwynne (Mayor of Eastbourne from 1929 to 1931) and chairman of the local panel of magistrates, and ex-Attorney-General Hartley Shawcross at a hotel in Lewes: the subject of their conversation is unreported and unknown. Goddard had already appointed Mr Justice Devlin to try Adams's case. Three months later, on 15 April, while the jury was out discussing the verdict on Adams' first charge of murder, Goddard telephoned to Devlin to suggest to him, if Adams were found not guilty, to grant Adams bail before he was tried on a second count of murder. Devlin was at first surprised since a person accused of murder had never been given bail before in British legal history, but on consideration saw its merit, but this move has been plausibly suggested as a warning to the prosecution of strong judicial displeasure over the Attorney-General's plan to proceed with the second indictment. As Lord Chief Justice, Goddard had a responsibility for the conduct of all courts in England and Wales, from magistrates' courts to the Court of Appeal.

Adams was acquitted on the first count of murder, and the second charge was controversially dropped via a nolle prosequi – an act by the prosecution that was later called an "abuse of process" by Devlin, saying: "The use of nolle prosequi to conceal the deficiencies of the prosecution was an abuse of process, which left an innocent man under the suspicion that there might have been something in the talk of mass murder after all". The pathologist Francis Camps considered the deaths of up to 163 of Adams' patients might be suspicious, but he conducted post-mortem examinations on only two of these which produced nothing of significance. The assistant investigating officer, Charles Hewett, suspected political interference to ensure Adams' acquittal, rather than accepting that the police investigation was sloppy, and their case was weak.

A month after Adams' trial, on 10 May 1957, Goddard heard a contempt of court case against Rolls House Publishing, publishers of Newsweek, and chain of newsagents W.H. Smith, who on 1 April during Adams' trial had respectively published and distributed an issue of the magazine containing two paragraphs of material "highly prejudicial to the accused", saying that Adams' victim count could be "as high as 400". Each company was fined £50. Goddard made no mention of his contact with Roland Gwynne or of a potential conflict of interest, if any existed.

== Retirement and death ==
After his retirement as Lord Chief Justice, Goddard was appointed a Knight Grand Cross of the Order of the Bath (GCB) on 30 September 1958. In January 1959, four months after retiring as Lord Chief Justice, Goddard resumed regular judicial sittings in the House of Lords, continuing until 1964 when he fully retired. During this period he was a member of the judicial committee of the House of Lords in several controversial appeal cases, including Director of Public Prosecutions v Smith (1961), Sykes v Director of Public Prosecutions (1962), and Attorney-General for Northern Ireland v Gallagher (1963). In April 1959 Goddard took the unprecedented step of returning to sit in the Court of Appeal for almost a year to help clear a backlog of appeal cases.

After retiring as Lord Chief Justice, Goddard continued to intervene occasionally in Lords debates and public speeches to put forward his views in favour of judicial corporal punishment. On 12 December 1960 he said in the House of Lords that the law was too much biased in favour of the criminal. Goddard also expressed his opposition to the legalisation of homosexual acts on 24 May 1965. His final speech in the House of Lords was in April 1968 at the age of 91, praising the City of London's law courts.

=== August 1970 interview ===
In the final interview he gave, in August 1970, Goddard told David Yallop that being Lord Chief Justice was not an easy job. When Yallop, who believed that Craig should have been imprisoned for manslaughter and Bentley thus cleared, asked Goddard about Bentley's execution, he received the following reply, "Yes, I thought that Bentley was going to be reprieved. He certainly should have been. There's no doubt in my mind whatsoever that Bentley should have been reprieved". Goddard also said if Fyfe had consulted him he would have recommended a reprieve.

Goddard remarked that what troubled him was not Bentley being hanged when he was close to the minimum age, but the hard facts of the case.

Goddard went on to criticise David Maxwell Fyfe in the two-hour interview, saying that he made the recommendation of mercy to Maxwell-Fyfe and that "Bentley's execution was an act of supreme illogicality. I was never consulted over it (the decision and execution). In fact he (Maxwell Fyfe) never consulted anyone. The blame for Bentley's execution rests solely with Fyfe". It is true that Maxwell Fyfe, who died in January 1967, was as much a supporter of the death penalty as Goddard. However, despite stating his opposition to Bentley's execution, Goddard still expressed his strong support for the death penalty and asserted that the law was biased in favour of the criminal.

Whether Goddard felt this at the time of Bentley's execution, or was saying it in hindsight, remains a moot point. Goddard's claims were disputed by John Parris in his book Scapegoat (Duckworth), published in 1991. Parris, who died in September 1996, was Craig's barrister at the 1952 trial, and wrote that Goddard told Maxwell Fyfe to ignore the jury's recommendation for mercy, and that Bentley must be hanged.

=== Death ===
Goddard died at his home in The Temple, London on 29 May 1971. He was cremated four days later. No memorial service was held. When alive, Goddard said he did not want one as they were "exercises in hypocrisy". He left over £100,000 in his will, which was sworn for probate in July 1971.

== Criticism ==
After Goddard's death, he was attacked in the columns of The Times by Bernard Levin, who described him as "a calamity" and accused him of "vindictiveness" and of being "a malign influence" on penal reform. Levin had also attacked Goddard when he retired as Lord Chief Justice 13 years earlier in a Spectator article, saying he "walked hand in hand with ignorance on one side of him and barbarism on the other". In The Times on 8 June 1971, Levin wrote (referring to Goddard's assertion in 1970 that he had been "very unhappy" about Bentley being hanged) that "if Goddard did indeed claim this, it was a breathtaking piece of hypocrisy, in view of his conduct of the case". Afterwards Levin was blackballed by the Garrick Club, a favourite resort of both lawyers and journalists, when his application for membership came up.

On 30 July 1998, the Court of Appeal quashed Derek Bentley's conviction on the basis of Goddard's misdirection to the jury which, according to Lord Bingham, "must [...] have driven the jury to conclude that they had little choice but to convict." He added that the summing-up of the case was "such as to deny the appellant [Bentley] the fair trial which is the birthright of every British citizen". Bingham also, however, acknowledged that Goddard was "one of the outstanding criminal judges of the century", and underlined the change in social standards between 1953 and 1998. The decision to review the case decades after Bentley's death was criticised as "rewriting history".

== In popular culture and legal legend ==
Goddard was portrayed by Roland Culver in the 1972 TV movie To Encourage the Others, and by Michael Gough in the 1991 film Let Him Have It, both about the trial of Derek Bentley and Christopher Craig.

In 1953, Craig's barrister John Parris was disbarred for four months on the grounds that he publicly implied that Goddard was not an impartial judge. In his own 1991 book on the case Scapegoat, Parris claimed that Goddard's clerk Arthur Smith told him that the Lord Chief Justice ejaculated when passing a sentence of death or flogging, and that a fresh pair of trousers had to be brought on those occasions. In the 1998 decision quashing Bentley's conviction, the Court of Appeal excluded a statement of Parris about Goddard's conduct during the trial and added that "we have some anecdotal background knowledge of matters which would cause us to approach the testimony of Mr Parris with some reserve".

In "Prisoner and Escort", the pilot episode of the BBC sitcom Porridge, Norman Stanley Fletcher says about strict and authoritarian Prison Officer Mackay: "I bet he's the secretary of the Lord Chief Justice Goddard Appreciation Society", a remark referring to strict views on criminals, society and justice which Mackay and Goddard largely shared.

== Bibliography ==
- Lord Goddard: His career and cases by Glyn Jones and Eric Grimshaw (Allan Wingate, London, 1958).
- Lord Goddard: My Years With the Lord Chief Justice by Arthur Smith (Weidenfeld & Nicolson, London, 1959) is a sympathetic biography by Goddard's chief clerk.
- "To Encourage the Others" by David Yallop (Allen 1971). The first authoritative and thorough study of the Bentley/Craig case.
- Scapegoat, John Parris (Duckworth 1991). An account of the Craig and Bentley trial by Craig's barrister.
- Daly v Cannon [1954] 1 WLR 261 (QB).

Legal offices
Preceded by The Viscount Caldecote	Lord Chief Justice; 1946–1958	Succeeded by The Lord Parker of Waddington
