= Stephen Gallagher =

English screenwriter and novelist

Stephen Gallagher (born 13 October 1954) is an English screenwriter and novelist. Gallagher was born in Salford, Lancashire, and attended Eccles Grammar School, then graduated from the University of Hull with Joint Honours in Drama and English. First worked as a documentaries researcher for Yorkshire Television and then in the Presentation Department of Granada TV, (now ITV Granada).

== Career ==
Gallagher has written novels and television scripts, including for the BBC television series Doctor Who — for which he wrote two serials, Warriors' Gate (1981) and Terminus (1983)—as well as for the series Rosemary & Thyme and Bugs, for two seasons of which he was script consultant along with Brian Clemens. He adapted his own novel Chimera as a 90-minute dramatized audio drama for BBC Radio 4 in 1985, and as a miniseries of the same name that was shown on ITV in 1991. He also directed the miniseries adaptation of Oktober, as well as writing the feature-length episode The Kingdom of Bones for the BBC series Murder Rooms.

He created and wrote a science-based series for ITV, Eleventh Hour, starring Patrick Stewart as a government science investigator and advisor. The programme was rumoured to be ITV's answer to the new series of Doctor Who, but was more in the tradition of the hard-science thriller. Gallagher's series format was acquired for a US television remake by the CSI trio of CBS, Jerry Bruckheimer and director Danny Cannon. The series aired on CBS and starred Rufus Sewell and Marley Shelton.

Life Line, broadcast in 2007, was a two-part supernatural mystery starring Ray Stevenson, Joanne Whalley and Jemima Rooper. Gallagher was later lead writer and story supervisor on NBC's 13-part series Crusoe, screened in 2008/2009, and contributed two episodes to the US version of Eleventh Hour including Medea, the season finale. In 2009 he served as Co-Executive Producer on Bruckheimer's crime show The Forgotten, starring Christian Slater. Legacy, a two-part story for season 16 of the BBC's Silent Witness, was Best Drama winner in the 2013 European Science TV and New Media Awards. He later wrote episodes of Stan Lee's Lucky Man.

In June 2025 the radio drama An Alternative to Suicide was rebroadcast as part of a Hidden Treasures strand on BBC Radio 4 Extra. Starring Michael Jayston and directed by Martin Jenkins, the Saturday Night Theatre production was considered a lost work after the play's master tapes were erased for re-use. A copy was restored to the archive through the work of non-profit organisation The Radio Circle.

== Bibliography ==
=== Novels ===
==== Original ====
- The Last Rose of Summer – 1978 (later revised as Dying of Paradise, 1982 as by Stephen Couper)
- Chimera (adapted in 1991 into a TV mini-series) – 1982
- The Ice Belt – 1983 (as Stephen Couper)
- Follower – 1984
- Valley of Lights – 1987
- Oktober (TV series) – 1988
- Down River – 1989
- Rain – 1990
- The Boat House – 1991
- Nightmare, With Angel – 1992
- Red, Red Robin – 1995
- White Bizango – 2002
- The Spirit Box – 2005
- The Painted Bride – 2006
- The Kingdom of Bones – 2007
- The Bedlam Detective – 2012
- The Authentic William James – 2016
- The Babylon Run - 2022
- The Next Thing You See When You Die - 2024 (novella)

==== Omnibus ====
- Dying of Paradise: The Trilogy – 2022

==== Novelizations ====
- Saturn Three – 1980 (film novelisation)
- Silver Dream Racer – 1980 (film novelisation, as John Lydecker)
- Doctor Who - Warriors' Gate – 1982 (as John Lydecker)
- Doctor Who - Terminus – 1983 (as John Lydecker)
- The Kids from Fame – 1983 (as Lisa Todd, based on TV series Fame)
- The Kids from Fame II – 1983 (as Lisa Todd, based on TV series Fame)
- Doctor Who: Warriors' Gate and Beyond – 2023 (printing longer draft of novelization, along with two new related stories) "The Kairos Ring" and a new story, "The Little Book of Fate"

=== Non-fiction ===
- Journeyman: The Art of Chris Moore – 2000

=== Screenplays ===
- Trick Shot – 1980 (short film)
- Doctor Who: Warriors’ Gate - 1981 (BBC)
- Doctor Who: Terminus – 1983 (BBC)
- Rockliffe's Folly: Moving Targets – 1988 (BBC)
- Chimera – 1991 (Zenith/Anglia)
- Chiller: Prophecy – 1995 (YTV)
- Chiller: Here Comes the Mirror Man – 1995 (YTV)
- Bugs: Assassins, Inc – 1995 (Carnival Films/BBC)
- Bugs: Down Among the Dead Men – 1995 (Carnival Films/BBC)
- Bugs: Stealth – 1995 (Carnival Films/BBC)
- Bugs: Pulse – 1995 (Carnival Films/BBC)
- Bugs: Schrodinger’s Bomb – 1996 (Carnival Films/BBC)
- Bugs: The Bureau of Weapons – 1996 (Carnival Films/BBC)
- Bugs: A Cage for Satan – 1996 (Carnival Films/BBC)
- Bugs: Blaze of Glory – 1997 (Carnival Films/BBC)
- Bugs: The Revenge Effect – 1997 (Carnival Films/BBC)
- Bugs: Renegades – 1997 (Carnival Films/BBC)
- Oktober – 1998 (Carnival Films/ITV)
- Murder Rooms: Mysteries of the Real Sherlock Holmes: The Kingdom of Bones – 2001 (BBC Films)
- Rosemary & Thyme: The Memory of Water – 2004 (Carnival Films)
- Rosemary & Thyme: The Cup of Silence – 2005 (Carnival Films)
- Eleventh Hour: Resurrection – 1983 (Granada TV)
- Eleventh Hour: Containment – 1987 (Granada TV)
- Life Line – 2007 (Carnival Films)
- Crusoe: Rum – 2008 (NBC/Power TV)
- Crusoe: Gunpowder – 2008 (NBC/Power TV)
- Crusoe: Sacrifice – 2008 (NBC/Power TV) (uncredited)
- Crusoe: The Traveler – 2009 (NBC/Power TV)
- Crusoe: The Return – 2009 (NBC/Power TV)
- Eleventh Hour: Resurrection – 2008 (CBS/Bruckheimer TV) (story by)
- Eleventh Hour: Containment – 2008 (CBS/Bruckheimer TV) (story by)
- Eleventh Hour: Subway – 2009 (CBS/Bruckheimer TV)
- Eleventh Hour: Medea – 2009 (CBS/Bruckheimer TV)
- The Forgotten: Canine John – 2010 (CBS/Bruckheimer TV)
- The Forgotten: Patient John – 2010 (CBS/Bruckheimer TV)
- Silent Witness: Legacy, Part 1 – 2013 (BBC)
- Silent Witness: Legacy, Part 2 – 2013 (BBC)
- Stan Lee's Lucky Man: Charm Offensive – 2016 (Carnival Films/POW! Entertainment/Sky)

=== Radio and Audio ===
- The Last Rose of Summer – 1977 (6x30’, Piccadilly Radio)
- Hunters’ Moon – 1978 (8x30, Piccadilly Radio)
- The Humane Solution – 1979 (90’, BBC Radio 4 Saturday Night Theatre)
- The Babylon Run – 1979 (4x30, Piccadilly Radio)
- An Alternative to Suicide – 1979 (90’, BBC Radio 4 Saturday Night Theatre)
- A Resistance to Pressure – 1980 (90’, BBC Radio 4 Saturday Night Theatre)
- Chimera – 1985 (90’, BBC Radio 4 Saturday Night Theatre)
- The Kingston File – 1987 (90’, BBC Radio 4 Saturday Night Theatre)
- The Wonderful Visit – 1988 (45’, H. G. Wells adaptation, BBC Radio 4 Afternoon Theatre)
- By the River, Fontainebleau – 1988 (30’, BBC Radio 4 Fear on Four)
- The Horn – 1989 (30’, BBC Radio 4 Fear on Four)
- The Visitors’ Book – 1992 (15', short story, BBC Radio 4, reader Terence Edmond)
- Life Line – 1993 (30’, BBC Radio 4, Fear on Four)
- The Bedlam Detective – 2012 (Audiobook, Dreamscape Media, reader Michael Page)
- The Kingdom of Bones – 2013 (Audiobook, Oakhill Publishing, reader Jonathan Keeble)
- The Box – 2013 (30’, Hammer Chillers, Bafflegab Productions)
- The Bedlam Detective – 2014 (Audiobook, Oakhill Publishing, reader Jonathan Keeble)
- Nightmare Country – 2019 (Doctor Who: The Lost Stories, Big Finish Productions)
- Warriors’ Gate – 2019 (Audiobook, BBC Audio, reader Jon Culshaw)
- Casting the Runes – 2019 (M. R. James adaptation, Bafflegab Productions)
- Terminus – 2019 (Audiobook, BBC Audio, reader Steven Pacey)
- The Kairos Ring – 2021 (Audio original, BBC Audio, reader Steven Pacey)

=== Theatre ===
- Cheeky Boy – March 2018 (portmanteau drama The Ghost Train Doesn't Stop Here Any More, Tristan Bates Theatre, London)

=== Short fiction - Collections ===
- Out of His Mind – 2004 (collection of short stories, winner of the British Fantasy Award with an introduction by Brian Clemens)
- Plots and Misadventures – 2007 (second collection of short stories)
- Comparative Anatomy: the Best of Stephen Gallagher – 2022 (Subterranean Press, with an introduction by Stephen Volk)

=== Comics ===
- Faustine: Princess of Tharil - 2023 (Gods and Monsters, Cutaway Comics)
- Losko of the Antonine - 2026 (Gods and Monsters Phase 2, Cutaway Comics)

=== Stories ===
- Short stories unless otherwise noted.

Key to collections: CA=Comparative Anatomy, OOHM= Out of his Mind, PM=Plots & Misadventures

Title	Year	First published	Reprinted/collected	Notes
A Mystery for Julie Chu	2021	Beyond the Veil, ed Mark Morris, Flame Tree Press	CA	Hunting magical memorabilia
Blame the French	2013	Twisted Histories, ed Scott Harrison, Snowbooks	CA	Odysseus in a pub
By the River, Fontainebleau	2001	"By the River, Fontainebleau". F&SF. 71 (2): 77–90. August 1986.	OOHM	French Impressionist horror
Casey, Where He Lies	1991	Imagination 8, ed Ian Murphy, Kingfisher Press	OOHM	Master tape of the dead
Comparative Anatomy	1990	Night Visions 8, Dark Harvest	CA	Mystery sea cruise
Dead Man’s Handle	1990	Night Visions 8, Dark Harvest	Northern Chills, ed Graeme Hurry, 1994	Low-rent park ride haunting
DeVice	1991	Hotter Blood, ed Jeff Gelb		BDSM goes wrong
Doctor Hood	2003	The Dark, ed Ellen Datlow, TOR Books	PM	Scientific ghost hunt
Dracula	2018	Dark Mirages, ed Paul Kane, PS Publishing		Commissioned BBC screenplay, 2 parts
Driving Force	1989	Fear Magazine, ed John Gilbert, May/June 1989, July 1989 (in two parts)	OOHM	Meat eating car
EELS	2007	"Eels". Postscripts Magazine. 1 (10). Spring 2007.	CA	Eel breeding neighbour
Eternal Flame	2013	Andromeda Spaceways Inflight Magazine, ed Jacob Edwards, issue 55		Magic gas tank
Fancy That!	1995	Shivers for Christmas, ed Richard Dalby, Michael O’Mara Books	OOHM	Rat breeder and customer
Feeding Frenzy	2001	Walking in Eternity, ed Julian Eales, Factor Fiction		Doctor Who charity short
God’s Bright Little Engine	1994	Tombs, ed Peter Crowther and Edward E Kramer, White Wolf Publishing	OOHM	Repairman revenant
Heroes and Villains (alt:Cheeky Boy)	2015	The Doll Collection, ed Ellen Datlow, TOR Books	CA	Creepy ventriloquism
Homebodies	1992	Dark at Heart, ed Karen and Joe R Lansdale, Dark Harvest		Precursor to Red, Red Robin
Hounded	2022	Bonus e-story, Subterranean Press		Scheming dogs
Hunter, Killer	1990	Night Visions 8, Dark Harvest	PM	A bit like Predator
In Gethsemane	1995	Heaven Sent, ed Peter Crowther, DAW Books	CA, OOHM	Conjuror vs Spiritualist
Jailbird for Jesus	2003	The Best British Mysteries, ed Maxim Jakubowski	PM	Convenience store, undercover cop
Life Line	1989	Dark Fantasies, ed Christopher Morgan, Legend	CA, OOHM	Haunted chat line
Like Clockwork	1987	"Like Clockwork". The Magazine of Fantasy & Science Fiction. 72 (3): 21–35. March 1987.	PM	Body part replacement tech
Like Shadows in the Dark	1987	Shadows 10, ed Charles L Grant, Doubleday	OOHM	Precursor to The Boat House (1)
Little Angels	2004	Out of his Mind, collection, PS Publishing	CA, OOHM	Grandma’s revenge
Little Dead Girl Singing	2002	Darrell Schweitzer; George H Scithers, eds. (March 1987). "Like Clockwork". Weird Tales. 55 (3). DNA Publications.	CA, PM	Weird Child in a contest
Magpie	1991	Final Shadows, ed Charles L Grant, Doubleday	CA, OOHM	Schoolboy revenge
Melody James	2018	The Brooligan Press		The carny and the spy
Misadventure	2007	Inferno, ed Ellen Datlow, TOR Books	CA	Spooky leisure centre
Modus Operandi	1989	New Crimes, ed Maxim Jakubowski, Robinson	OOHM	Child and a burglary
Mousetrap	1992	The Little Book of Horrors, ed Sebastian Wolfe, Xanadu		Short short
My Repeater	2001	"My repeater". F&SF. 100 (1): 122–136. January 2001.	CA, PM	Time travelling failures
Night Flight	2023	Great British Horror 8, ed Steve J Shaw, Black Shuck Books		Author stalks fan
Nightmare, with Angel	1983	"Nightmare, with Angel". F&SF. 65 (5). November 1983.		Arizona motel killer. Unrelated to the novel of the same title
No Life For Me Without You, Vodyanoi	1985	"No Life For Me Without You, Vodyanoi". F&SF. 69 (3). September 1985.	OOHM	Precursor to The Boat House (2)
Not Here, Not Now	1995	Cold Cuts 3, ed Paul Lewis, Steve Lockley, Alun Books	CA, OOHM	Reckless driver comeuppance
O, Virginia	1997	Shades of Blonde, ed Carole Nelson Douglas, Forge	CA, OOHM	Parts of the stars
Old, Red Shoes	1998	Jack the Ripper, ed Susan Casper and Gardner Dozois, Futura	OOHM	Ripper office pranksters
One Dove	2014	Subterranean Magazine, ed William Schafer, Subterranean Press	CA	Edwardian crime
Out of Bedlam	2012	Crimetime Online		Edwardian crime
Poisoned	1997	Kimota 6, ed Graeme Hurry	OOHM	Childhood accident with a twist
Restraint	2004	Postscripts Magazine 1, ed Peter Crowther, PS Publishing	CA, PM	Pursued by ex, night, road, kids
Ribbon of Darkness, Over Me	1989	"Ribbon of Darkness, Over Me". F&SF. 77 (2). August 1989.		Precursor to Down River
Shepherds’ Business	2017	New Fears, ed Mark Morris, Titan Books	CA	Scottish island horror
The Adventure of the Seven Unnatural Women	2022	Gaslight Ghouls, ed Charles Prepolec and J R Campbell		Sherlock Holmes
The Back of His Hand	1990	Night Visions 8, Dark Harvest	CA, PM	Tattoo removal shocker
The Backtrack	2022	Comparative Anatomy, Subterranean Press	CA	Buried secrets in a scrapped car
The Beautiful Feast of the Valley	2018	The Mammoth Book of Halloween Stories, ed Stephen Jones, Skyhorse Publishing	CA	Plutarch in the machine
The Blackwood Oak	2007	Plots and Misadventures (collection)	Reissued as standalone chapbook	Hunting fairies with pickup truck and cattle prod
The Boy Who Talked to the Animals	1985	"The Boy Who Talked to the Animals". F&SF. 68 (2). February 1985.	CA	Theme park behind the scenes
The Box	2006	Retro Pulp Tales, ed Joe R Lansdale, Subterranean Press	CA	Haunted helicopter escape
The Bucket Woman	2006	British Fantasy Society calendar		Short short horror
The Butterfly Garden	2006	Joe R Lansdale’s Lords of the Razor, ed William Schafer and Bill Sheehan, Subterranean Press	CA	Teen of the Flies
The Enchanted Ape	2026	No Laughing Matter, ed Peter Coleborn and Mike Chinn, Flame Tree Press		Wellesian shapeshifter
The Drain	1990	Fantasy Tales, ed Stephen Jones, David A Sutton	OOHM	Kids on a quest
The Governess	2021	The Brooligan Press	CA	Winner of the Arthur Conan Doyle Society’s inaugural award for fiction
The Horn	1989	Arrows of Eros, ed Alex Stewart, New English Library	OOHM	Dead Mistress in a snowstorm
The Kairos Ring	2021	BBC Audio original		Dr Who spinoff novella
The Jigsaw Girl	1986	Shadows 9, ed Charles L Grant, Doubleday	OOHM	Fortune telling toy
The Plot	2006	Subterranean Magazine 5, ed William Schafer, Subterranean Press	CA, PM	Revenge on Victorian cleric
The Price	1985	"The Price". Isaac Asimov's Science Fiction Magazine. 9 (6). May 1985.	CA	Twist of fate
The Sluice	1992	Narrow Houses, ed Peter Crowther, Little, Brown	OOHM	Uncanny care home tale
The Visitors’ Book	1991	Darklands, ed Nicholas Royle, Egerton Press	CA, OOHM	Dread in a holiday home
The Wishing Ball	1987	Winter Chills 2, ed Peter Coleborn, British Fantasy Society	PM	Snuffing mom’s ex
To Dance by the Light of the Moon	1986	"To Dance by the Light of the Moon". F&SF. 70 (1). January 1986.	CA	Stalking the late night DJ
Twisted Hazel	2020	Tales of Dark Fantasy, ed William Schafer, Subterranean Press	CA	Young ghost made homeless
With Her in Spirit	2013	Thirteen (audio original), Fantom Publishing		Inspired by true story

== See also ==
- List of horror fiction authors
- List of thriller writers
