= Bob Mahoney (director) =

English film director and producer

- Occupations: Film director, producer
- Notable work: May We Borrow Your Husband?, The Governor, Critical Assignment

Bob Mahoney is an English film director and producer, known for his extensive work in theatre, television, and advertising. He has directed and produced numerous acclaimed productions on both Broadway and London's West End, as well as various television dramas and films.

== Early career ==
Mahoney began his career in the advertising industry, where he directed several notable commercials, including the well-known Shake n' Vac advert.

His work earned him multiple industry awards, including:

- Gold Clio Award (New York, 1978): Rotary Watches commercial, "I'm Late".
- Diploma, London Ad Awards (1979): K-Tel "Ronnie Barker" advertisement.
- Bronze, London Ad Awards (1977): Evening News "Classified" campaign.

== Theatre career ==
Mahoney served as a board director of Triumph Theatre Productions, alongside Duncan Weldon, Sir R. Millar, and J. Minskoff. Under his leadership, the company produced several successful plays on Broadway and in the West End, including:

- Sweet Bird of Youth (1975), starring Lauren Bacall.
- Aren't We All (1985), starring Rex Harrison and Claudette Colbert.
- Breaking the Code (1987), starring Derek Jacobi.
- American Buffalo (1983), starring Al Pacino.
- A Long Day's Journey into Night (1986), starring Jack Lemmon.
- A Walk in the Woods (1988), starring Alec Guinness and Edward Herrmann.
- The Merchant of Venice (1994), starring Dustin Hoffman.

== Film and television career ==
Mahoney transitioned into film and television, where he directed and produced various projects. His notable works include:

As director:

- May We Borrow Your Husband? (1986) – A television adaptation starring Dirk Bogarde.
- A Day in Summer (1989) – A television film featuring Peter Egan and Jack Shepherd.
- The Wanderer (1994) – A television series episode.
- Chiller (1995) – Directed two episodes of this horror anthology series.
- The Governor (1995–1996) – Directed episodes of this television drama series.
- Heartbeat (1992–1999) – Directed multiple episodes of this long-running television series.
- Maisie Raine (1998) – Directed episodes of this crime drama series.

As producer:

- Critical Assignment (2004) – A film produced for Diageo as part of a corporate social responsibility initiative.
- The Garden of Eden (2008) – A film adaptation of Ernest Hemingway's novel.
