= Peace movement =

Social movement against a particular war or wars

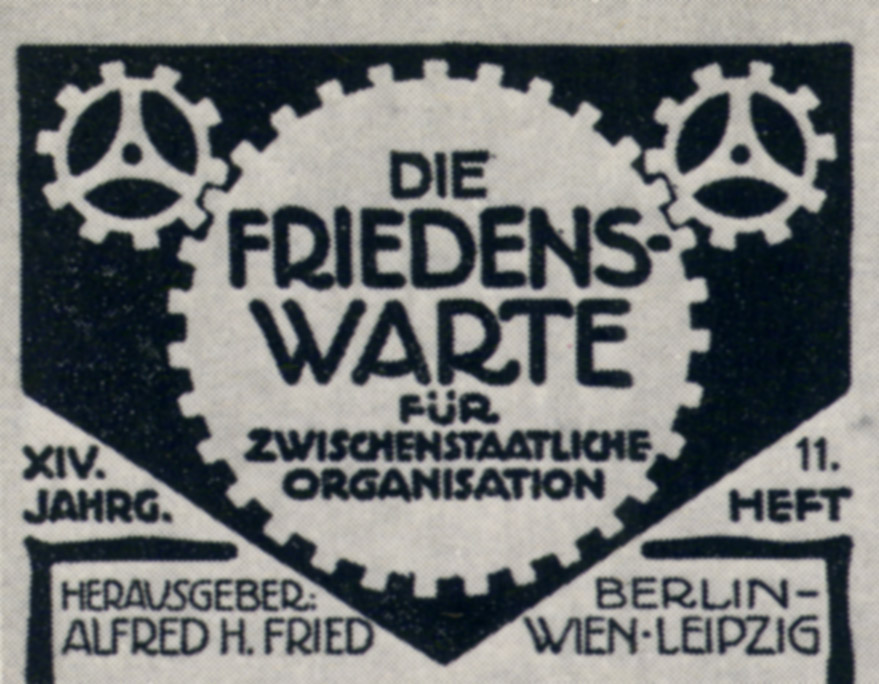
Cover of Die Friedens-Warte, a German journal of the peace movement, issue #11, 1913

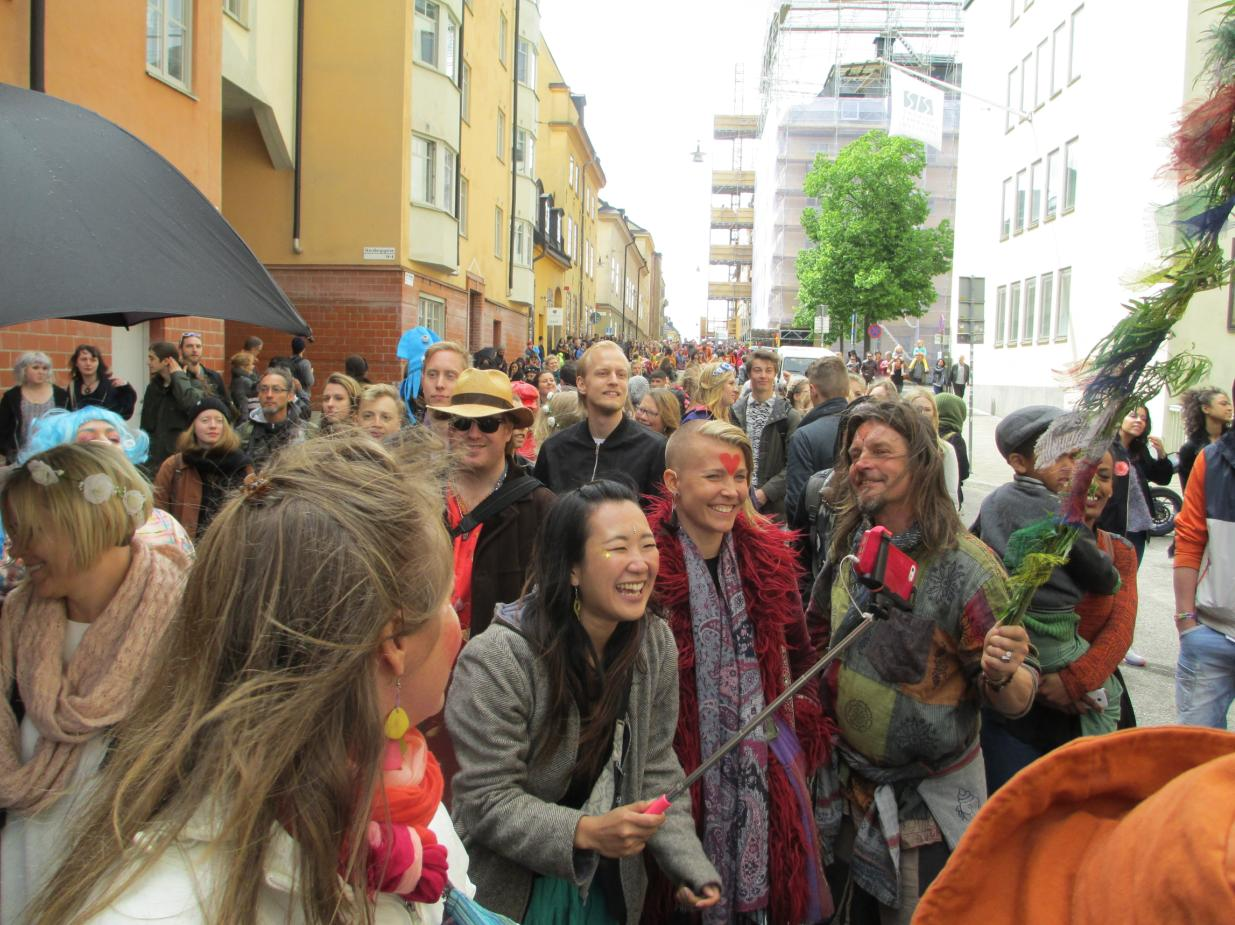
Sweden: Stockholm's May 2015 Peace and Love Rally through the south side of the city drew hundreds of marchers and celebrants.

A peace movement is a social movement which seeks to achieve ideals such as the ending of a particular war (or wars) or minimizing inter-human violence in a particular place or situation. They are often linked to the goal of achieving world peace. Some of the methods used to achieve these goals include advocacy of pacifism, nonviolent resistance, diplomacy, boycotts, peace camps, ethical consumerism, supporting anti-war political candidates, supporting legislation to remove profits from government contracts to the military–industrial complex, banning guns, creating tools for open government and transparency, direct democracy, supporting whistleblowers who expose war crimes or conspiracies to create wars, demonstrations, and political lobbying.

A global affiliation of activists and political interests viewed as having a shared purpose and constituting a single movement has been called "the peace movement", or an all-encompassing "anti-war movement". Seen from this perspective, they are often indistinguishable and constitute a loose, responsive, event-driven collaboration between groups motivated by humanism, environmentalism, veganism, anti-racism, feminism, decentralization, hospitality, ideology, theology, and faith.

== The ideal of peace ==
Ideas differ about what "peace" is (or should be), which results in a number of movements seeking different ideals of peace. Although "anti-war" movements often have short-term goals, peace movements advocate an ongoing lifestyle and a proactive government policy.

It is often unclear whether a movement, or a particular protest, is against war in general or against one's government's participation in a war. This lack of clarity (or long-term continuity) has been part of the strategy of those seeking to end a war, such as the Vietnam War.

Global protests against the U.S. invasion of Iraq in early 2003 are an example of a specific, short-term, loosely affiliated single-issue "movement" consisting of relatively-scattered ideological priorities ranging from pacifism to Islamism and Anti-Americanism. Those involved in multiple, similar short-term movements develop trust relationships with other participants, and tend to join more-global, long-term movements.

Elements of the global peace movement seek to guarantee health security by ending war and ensure what they view as basic human rights, including the right of all people to have access to clean air, water, food, shelter and health care. Activists seek social justice in the form of equal protection and equal opportunity under the law for groups which had been disenfranchised.

The peace movement is characterized by the belief that humans should not wage war or engage in ethnic cleansing about language, race, or natural resources, or engage in ethical conflict over religion or ideology. Long-term opponents of war are characterized by the belief that military power does not equal justice.

The peace movement opposes the proliferation of dangerous technology and weapons of mass destruction, particularly nuclear weapons and biological warfare. Many adherents object to the export of weapons (including hand-held machine guns and grenades) by leading economic nations to developing countries. The Stockholm International Peace Research Institute has voiced a concern that artificial intelligence, molecular engineering, genetics and proteomics have destructive potential. The peace movement intersects with Neo-Luddism and primitivism, and with mainstream critics such as Green parties, Greenpeace and the environmental movement.

These movements led to the formation of Green parties in a number of democratic countries in the late 20th century. The peace movement has influenced these parties in countries such as Germany.

== History ==
=== Peace and Truce of God ===
The first mass peace movements were the Peace of God (Latin: Pax Dei, proclaimed in AD 989 at the Council of Charroux) and the Truce of God, which was proclaimed in 1027. The Peace of God was spearheaded by bishops as a response to increasing violence against monasteries after the fall of the Carolingian dynasty. The movement was promoted at a number of subsequent church councils, including Charroux (989 and c. 1028), Narbonne (990), Limoges (994 and 1031), Poitiers (c. 1000), and Bourges (1038). The Truce of God sought to restrain violence by limiting the number of days of the week and times of the year when the nobility was able to employ violence. These peace movements "set the foundations for modern European peace movements."

=== Peace churches ===
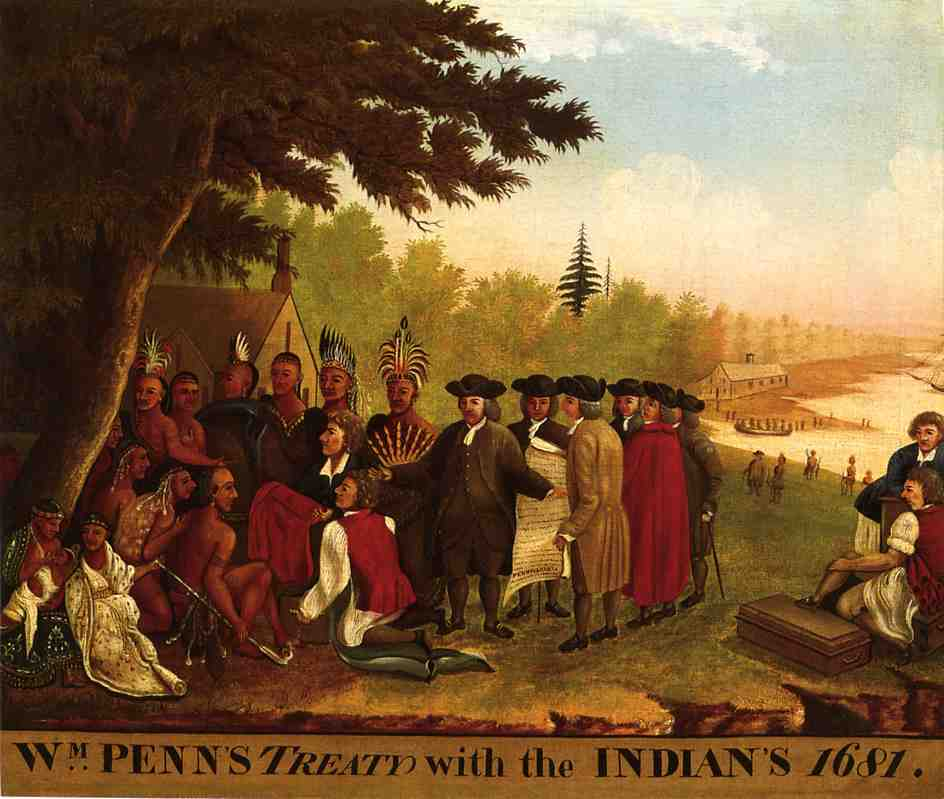
Penn's Treaty (1847), by Edward Hicks

The Reformation gave rise to a number of Protestant sects beginning in the 16th century, including the peace churches. Foremost among these churches were the Religious Society of Friends (Quakers), Amish, Mennonites, and the Church of the Brethren. The Quakers were prominent advocates of pacifism, who had repudiated all forms of violence and adopted a pacifist interpretation of Christianity as early as 1660. Throughout the 18th-century wars in which Britain participated, the Quakers maintained a principled commitment not to serve in an army or militia and not pay the alternative £10 fine.

=== 18th century ===
The major 18th-century peace movements were products of two schools of thought which coalesced at the end of the century. One, rooted in the secular Age of Enlightenment, promoted peace as the rational antidote to the world's ills; the other was part of the evangelical religious revival which had played an important role in the campaign for the abolition of slavery. Representatives of the former included Jean-Jacques Rousseau, in Extrait du Projet de Paix Perpetuelle de Monsieur l'Abbe Saint-Pierre (1756); Immanuel Kant in Thoughts on Perpetual Peace, and Jeremy Bentham, who proposed the formation of a peace association in 1789. One representative of the latter was William Wilberforce; Wilberforce thought that by following the Christian ideals of peace and brotherhood, strict limits should be imposed on British involvement in the French Revolutionary Wars.

=== 19th century ===
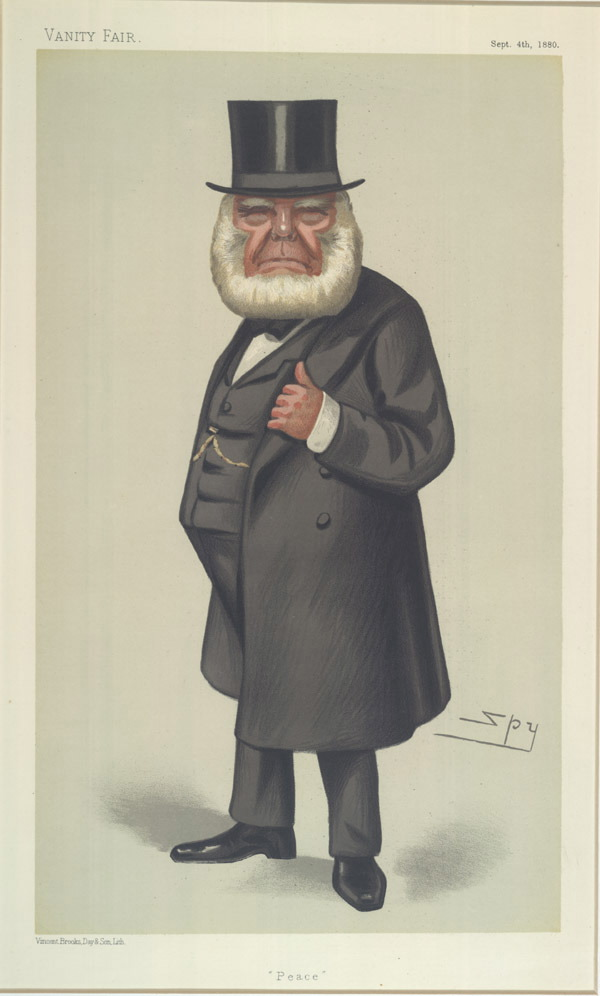
1880 caricature of Henry Richard, a prominent advocate of pacifism

During the Napoleonic Wars (1793–1814), no formal peace movement was established in Britain until hostilities ended. A significant grassroots peace movement, animated by universalist ideals, emerged from the perception that Britain fought in a reactionary role and the increasingly visible impact of the war on the nation's welfare in the form of higher taxes and casualties. Sixteen peace petitions to Parliament were signed by members of the public; anti-war and anti-Pitt demonstrations were held, and peace literature was widely disseminated.

The first formal peace movements appeared in 1815 and 1816. The first movement in the United States was the New York Peace Society, founded in 1815 by theologian David Low Dodge, followed by the Massachusetts Peace Society. The groups merged into the American Peace Society, which held weekly meetings and produced literature that was spread as far as Gibraltar and Malta describing the horrors of war and advocating pacifism on Christian grounds. The London Peace Society, also known as the Society for the Promotion of Permanent and Universal Peace, was formed by philanthropist William Allen in 1816 to promote permanent, universal peace. During the 1840s, British women formed 15-to-20 person "Olive Leaf Circles" to discuss and promote pacifist ideas.

The London Peace Society's influence began to grow during the mid-nineteenth century. Under Elihu Burritt and Henry Richard, the society convened the first International Peace Congress in London in 1843. The congress decided on two goals: to achieve the ideal of peaceable arbitration of the affairs of nations, and to create an international institution to achieve it. Richard became the society's full-time secretary in 1850; he held the position for the next 40 years, and became known as the "Apostle of Peace". He helped secure one of the peace movement's earliest victories by securing a commitment for arbitration from the Great Powers in the Treaty of Paris (1856) at the end of the Crimean War. Wracked by social upheaval, the first peace congress on the European continent was held in Brussels in 1848; a second was held in Paris a year later.

By the 1850s, these movements were becoming well organized in the major countries of Europe and North America, reaching middle-class activists beyond the range of the earlier religious connections.

Support decreased during the resurgence of militarism during the American Civil War and the Crimean War, the movement began to spread across Europe and infiltrate fledgling working-class socialist movements. In 1870, Randal Cremer formed the Workman's Peace Association in London. Cremer and the French economist Frédéric Passy were the founding fathers of the Inter-Parliamentary Union, the first international organization for the arbitration of conflicts, in 1889. The National Peace Council was founded after the 17th Universal Peace Congress in London in July and August 1908.

In the Austro-Hungarian Empire, the novelist Baroness Bertha von Suttner (1843–1914) after 1889 became a leading figure in the peace movement with the publication of her pacifist novel, Die Waffen nieder! (Lay Down Your Arms!). The book was published in 37 editions and translated into 12 languages. She helped organize the German Peace Society and became known internationally as the editor of the international pacifist journal Die Waffen nieder! In 1905 she became the first woman to win a Nobel Peace Prize.

=== Mahatma Gandhi and nonviolent resistance ===
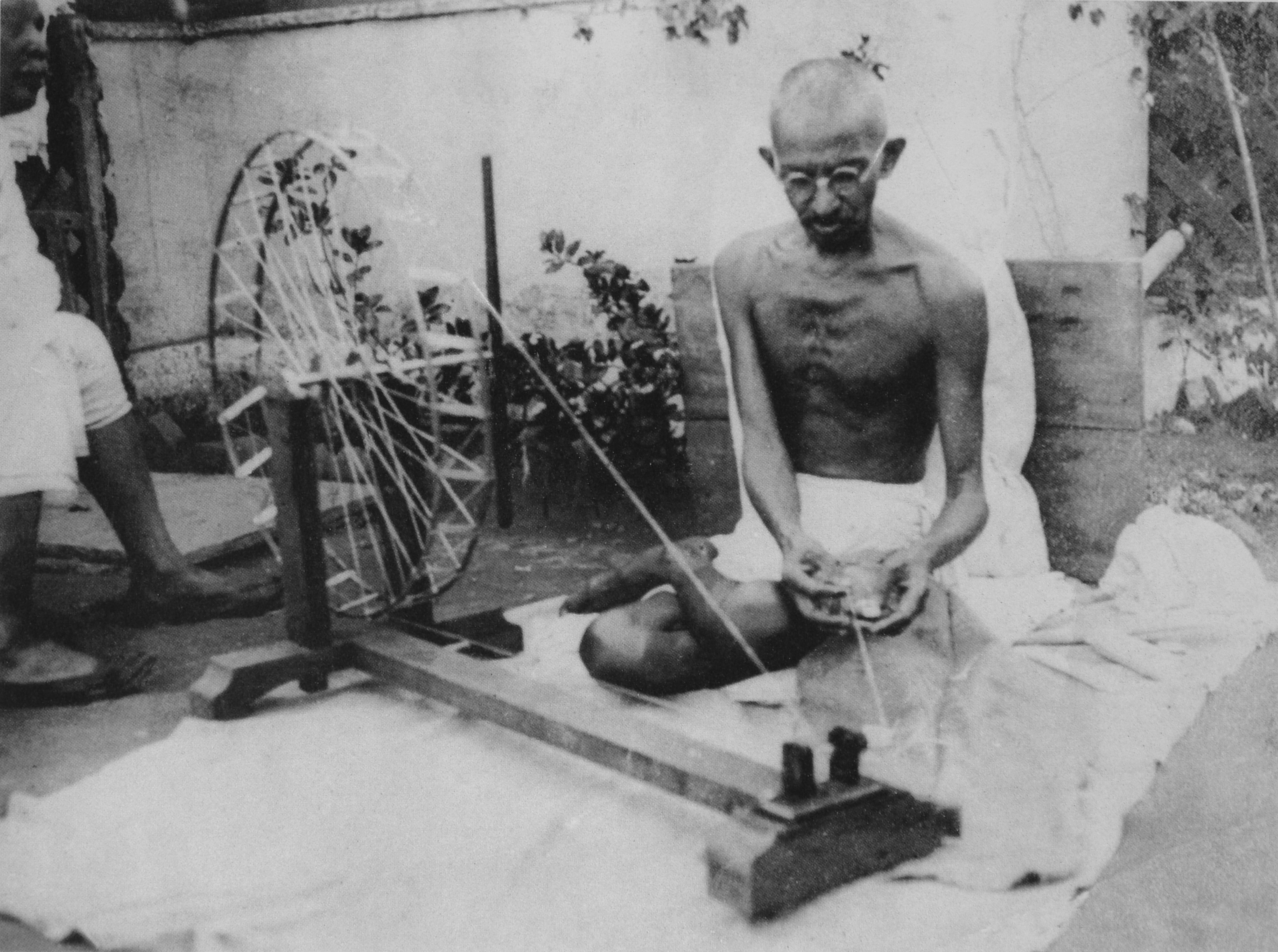
Mahatma Gandhi, leader of the Indian independence movement and advocate of nonviolent resistance

Mahatma Gandhi (1869–1948) was one of the 20th century's most influential spokesmen for peace and non-violence, and Gandhism is his body of ideas and principles Gandhi promoted. One of its most important concepts is nonviolent resistance. According to M. M. Sankhdher, Gandhism is not a systematic position in metaphysics or political philosophy but a political creed, an economic doctrine, a religious outlook, a moral precept, and a humanitarian worldview. An effort not to systematize wisdom but to transform society, it is based on faith in the goodness of human nature.

Gandhi was strongly influenced by the pacifism of Leo Tolstoy. Tolstoy wrote A Letter to a Hindu in 1908, which said that the Indian people could overthrow colonial rule only through passive resistance. In 1909, Gandhi and Tolstoy began a correspondence about the practical and theological applications of nonviolence. Gandhi saw himself as a disciple of Tolstoy because they agreed on the issues of opposition to state authority and colonialism, loathed violence, and preached non-resistance. However, they differed on political strategy. Gandhi called for political involvement; a nationalist, he was prepared to use nonviolent force but was also willing to compromise.

Gandhi was the first person to apply the principle of nonviolence on a large scale. The concepts of nonviolence (ahimsa) and nonresistance have a long history in Indian religious and philosophical thought, and have had a number of revivals in Hindu, Buddhist, Jain, Jewish and Christian contexts. Gandhi explained his philosophy and way of life in his autobiography, The Story of My Experiments with Truth. Some of his remarks were widely quoted, such as "There are many causes that I am prepared to die for, but no causes that I am prepared to kill for."

Gandhi later realized that a high level of nonviolence required great faith and courage, which not everyone possessed. He advised that everyone need not strictly adhere to nonviolence, especially if it was a cover for cowardice: "Where there is only a choice between cowardice and violence, I would advise violence."

Gandhi came under political fire for his criticism of those who attempted to achieve independence through violence. He responded, "There was a time when people listened to me because I showed them how to give fight to the British without arms when they had no arms ... but today I am told that my non-violence can be of no avail against the Hindu–Moslem riots; therefore, people should arm themselves for self-defense."

Gandhi's views were criticized in Britain during the Battle of Britain. He told the British people in 1940, "I would like you to lay down the arms you have as being useless for saving you or humanity. You will invite Herr Hitler and Signor Mussolini to take what they want of the countries you call your possessions ... If these gentlemen choose to occupy your homes, you will vacate them. If they do not give you free passage out, you will allow yourselves man, woman, and child to be slaughtered, but you will refuse to owe allegiance to them."

=== World War I ===
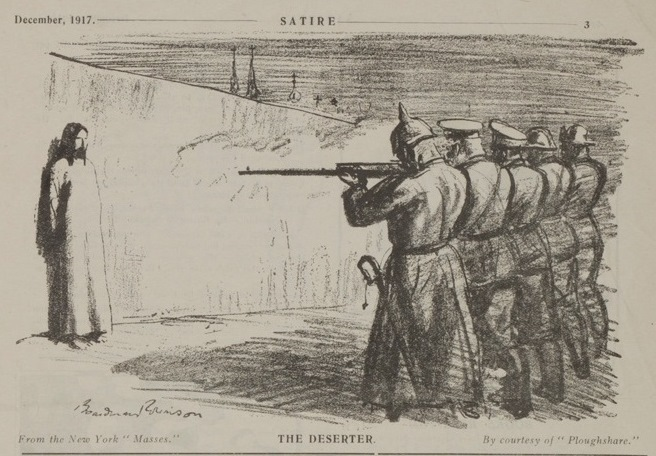
The Deserter (1916), by Boardman Robinson

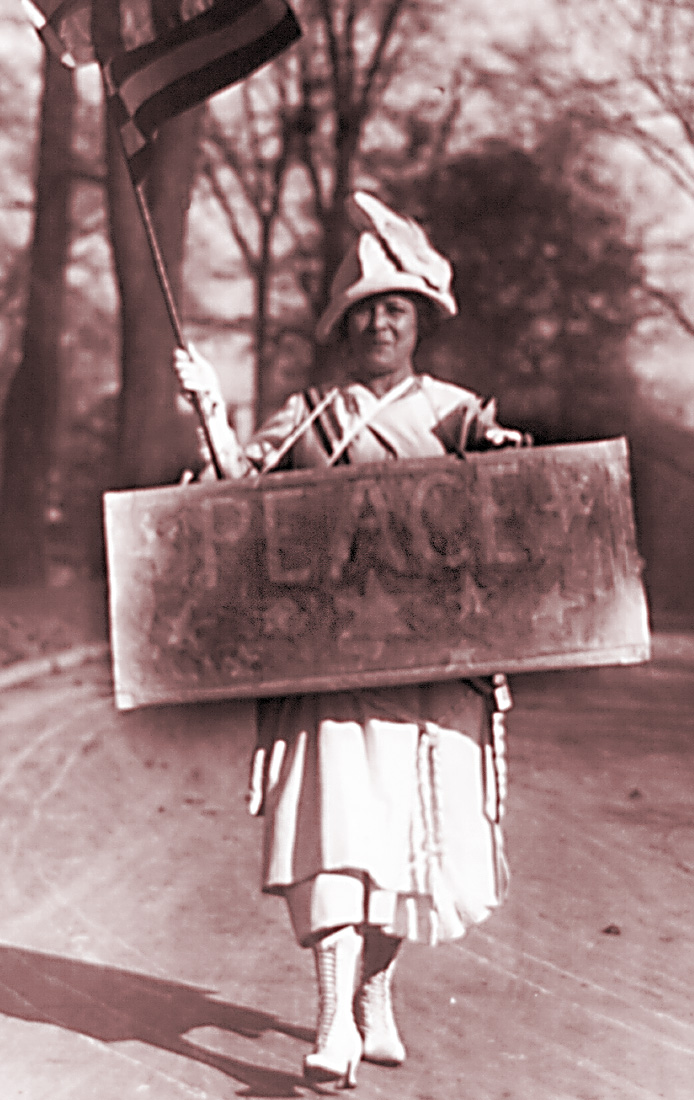
A World War I–era peace protester

Although the onset of the First World War was generally greeted with enthusiastic patriotism across Europe, peace groups were active in condemning the war. Many socialist groups and movements were antimilitarist. They argued that by its nature, war was a type of governmental coercion of the working class for the benefit of capitalist elites.

In 1915, the League of Nations Society was formed by British liberal leaders to promote a strong international organization which could enforce peaceful conflict resolution. Later that year, the League to Enforce Peace was established in the United States to promote similar goals. Hamilton Holt published "The Way to Disarm: A Practical Proposal", an editorial in the Independent (his New York City weekly magazine) on September 28, 1914. The editorial called for an international organization to agree on the arbitration of disputes and guarantee the territorial integrity of its members by maintaining military forces sufficient to defeat those of any non-member. The ensuing debate among prominent internationalists modified Holt's plan to align it more closely with proposals in Great Britain put forth by Viscount James Bryce, a former ambassador from the U.K. to the U.S. These and other initiatives were pivotal to the attitude changes which gave rise to the League of Nations after the war. In addition to the peace churches, groups which protested against the war included the Woman's Peace Party (organized in 1915 and led by Jane Addams), the International Committee of Women for Permanent Peace (ICWPP) (also organized in 1915), the American Union Against Militarism, the Fellowship of Reconciliation, and the American Friends Service Committee. Jeannette Rankin (the first woman elected to Congress) was another advocate of pacifism, and the only person to vote "no" on the U.S. entrance into both world wars.

==== Henry Ford ====
Peace promotion was a major activity of American automaker and philanthropist Henry Ford (1863–1947). He set up a $1 million fund to promote peace, and published numerous antiwar articles and ads in hundreds of newspapers.

According to biographer Steven Watts, Ford's status as a leading industrialist gave him a worldview that warfare was wasteful folly that retarded long-term economic growth. The losing side in the war typically suffered heavy damage. Small business were especially hurt, for it takes years to recuperate. He argued in many newspaper articles that capitalism would discourage warfare because, "If every man who manufactures an article would make the very best he can in the very best way at the very lowest possible price the world would be kept out of war, for commercialists would not have to search for outside markets which the other fellow covets." Ford admitted that munitions makers enjoyed wars, but he argued the typical capitalist wanted to avoid wars to concentrate on manufacturing and selling what people wanted, hiring good workers, and generating steady long-term profits.

In late 1915, Ford sponsored and funded a Peace Ship to Europe, to help end the raging World War. He brought 170 peace activists; Jane Addams was a key supporter who became too ill to join him. Ford talked to President Woodrow Wilson about the mission but had no government support. His group met with peace activists in neutral Sweden and the Netherlands. A target of much ridicule, Ford left the ship as soon as it reached Sweden.

=== Interwar period ===
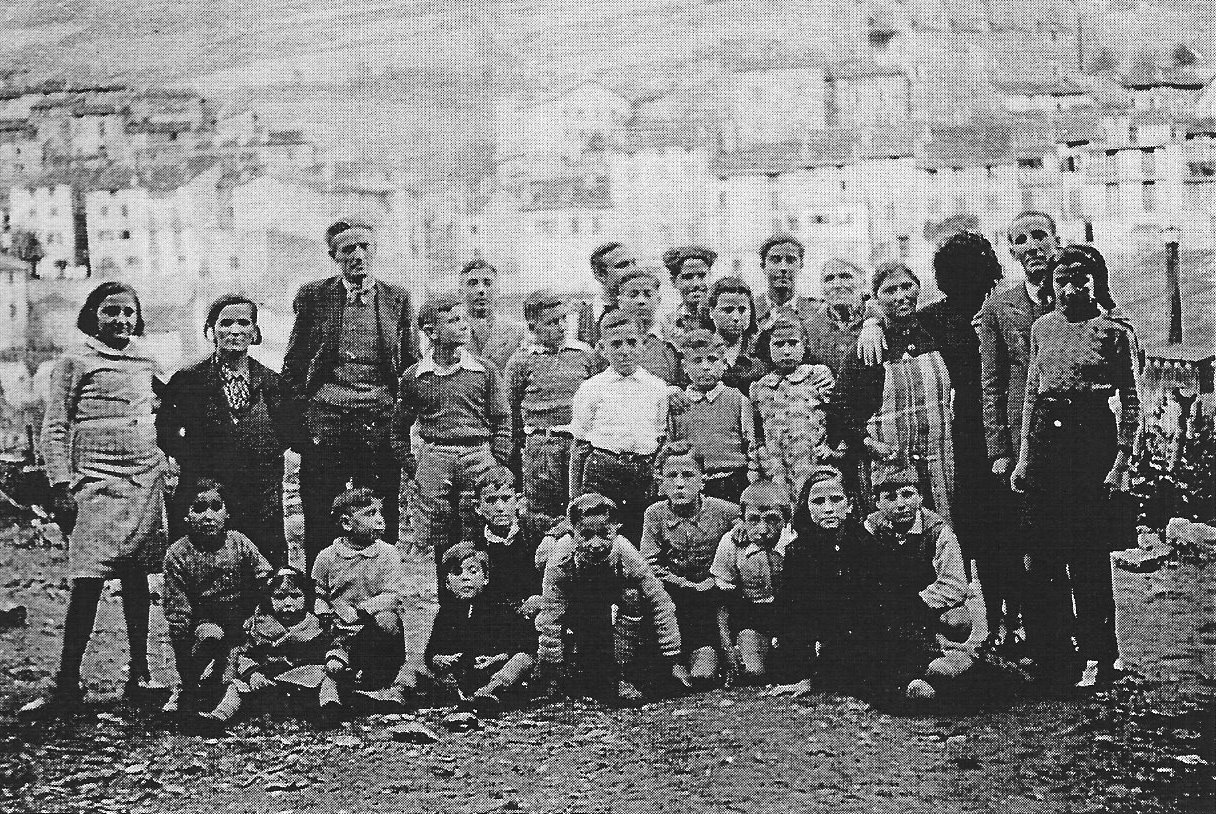
Refugees from the Spanish Civil War at the War Resisters' International children's refuge in the French Pyrenees

==== Organizations ====
A popular slogan was "merchants of death" alleging the promotion of war by armaments makers, based on a widely read nonfiction exposé Merchants of Death (1934), by H. C. Engelbrecht and F. C. Hanighen.

The immense loss of life during the First World War for what became known as futile reasons caused a sea-change in public attitudes to militarism. Organizations formed at this time included War Resisters' International, the Women's International League for Peace and Freedom, the No More War Movement, and the Peace Pledge Union (PPU). The League of Nations convened several disarmament conferences, such as the Geneva Conference. They achieved very little. However the Washington conference of 1921–1922 did successfully limit naval armaments of the major powers during the 1920s.

The Women's International League for Peace and Freedom helped convince the U.S. Senate to launch an influential investigation by the Nye Committee to the effect that the munitions industry and Wall Street financiers had promoted American entry into World War I to cover their financial investments. The immediate result was a series of laws imposing neutrality on American business if other countries went to war.

==== Novels and films ====
Pacifism and revulsion to war were popular sentiments in 1920s Britain. A number of novels and poems about the futility of war and the slaughter of youth by old fools were published, including Death of a Hero by Richard Aldington, Erich Maria Remarque's All Quiet on the Western Front and Beverley Nichols' Cry Havoc! A 1933 University of Oxford debate on the proposed motion that "one must fight for King and country" reflected the changed mood when the motion was defeated. Dick Sheppard established the Peace Pledge Union in 1934, renouncing war and aggression. The idea of collective security was also popular; instead of outright pacifism, the public generally exhibited a determination to stand up to aggression with economic sanctions and multilateral negotiations.

==== Spanish Civil War ====
The Spanish Civil War (1936–1939) was a major test of international pacifism, pacifist organizations (such as War Resisters' International and the Fellowship of Reconciliation), and individuals such as José Brocca and Amparo Poch. Activists on the left often put their pacifism on pause in order to help the war effort of the Spanish government. Shortly after the war ended, Simone Weil (despite volunteering for service on the Republican side) published The Iliad or the Poem of Force, which has been described as a pacifist manifesto. In response to the threat of fascism, pacifist thinkers such as Richard B. Gregg devised plans for a campaign of nonviolent resistance in the event of a fascist invasion or takeover.

=== World War II ===
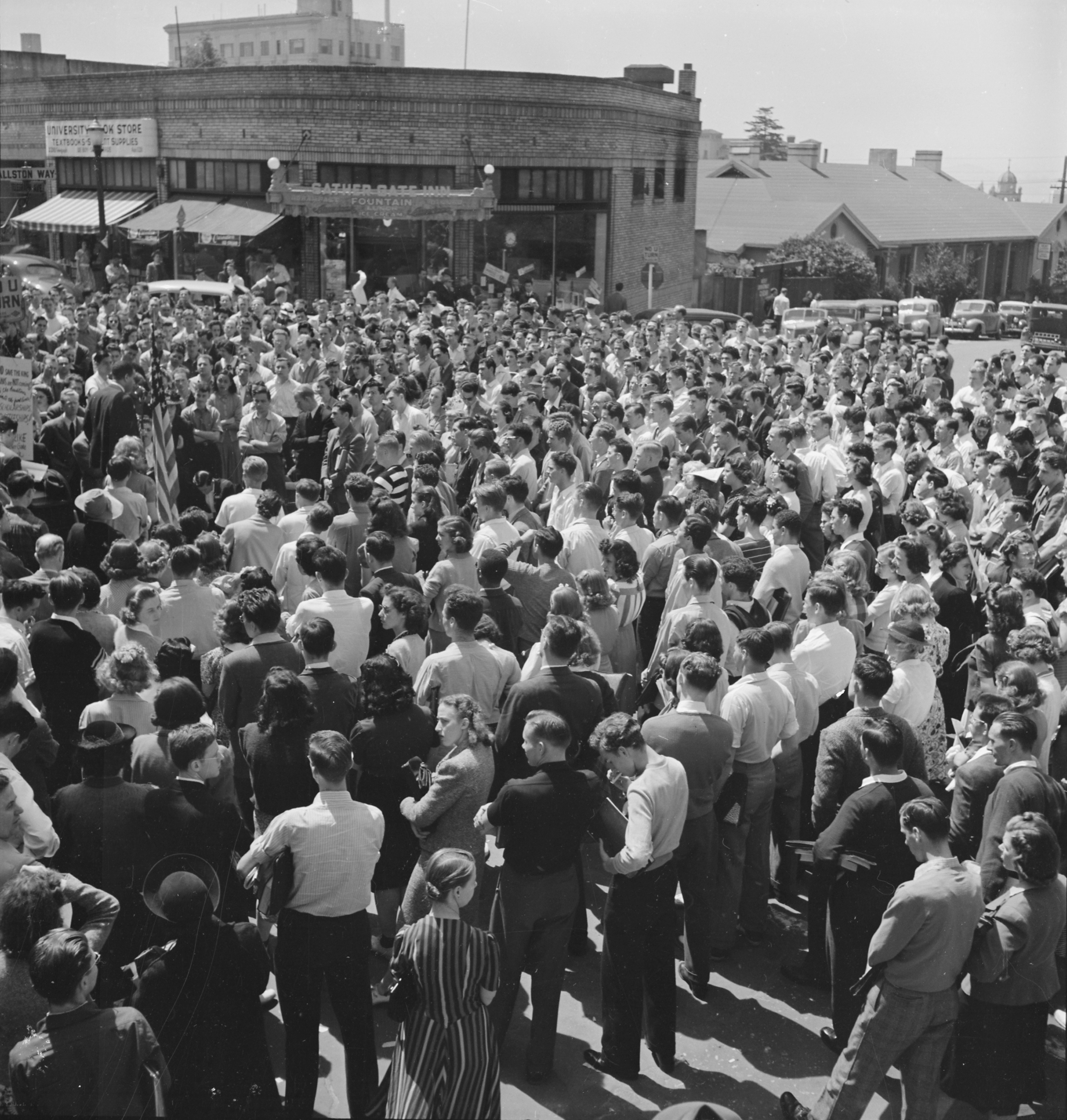
An April 1940 peace strike at the University of California, Berkeley

At the beginning of World War II, pacifist and anti-war sentiment declined in nations affected by the war. The communist-controlled American Peace Mobilization reversed its anti-war activism, however, when Germany invaded the Soviet Union in 1941. Although mainstream isolationist groups such as the America First Committee declined after the Japanese attack on Pearl Harbor, a number of small religious and socialist groups continued their opposition to the war. Bertrand Russell said that the necessity of defeating Adolf Hitler and the Nazis was a unique circumstance in which war was not the worst possible evil, and called his position "relative pacifism". Albert Einstein wrote, "I loathe all armies and any kind of violence, yet I'm firmly convinced that at present these hateful weapons offer the only effective protection." French pacifists André and Magda Trocmé helped to conceal hundreds of Jews fleeing the Nazis in the village of Le Chambon-sur-Lignon. After the war, the Trocmés were declared Righteous Among the Nations.

Pacifists in Nazi Germany were treated harshly. German pacifist Carl von Ossietzky and Norwegian pacifist Olaf Kullmann (who remained active during the German occupation) died in concentration camps. Austrian farmer Franz Jägerstätter was executed in 1943 for refusing to serve in the Wehrmacht.

Conscientious objectors and war tax resisters existed in both world wars, and the United States government allowed sincere objectors to serve in non-combat military roles. However, draft resisters who refused any cooperation with the war effort often spent much of each war in federal prisons. During World War II, pacifist leaders such as Dorothy Day and Ammon Hennacy of the Catholic Worker Movement urged young Americans not to enlist in the military. Peace movements have become widespread throughout the world since World War II, and their previously-radical beliefs are now a part of mainstream political discourse.

=== Anti-nuclear movement ===
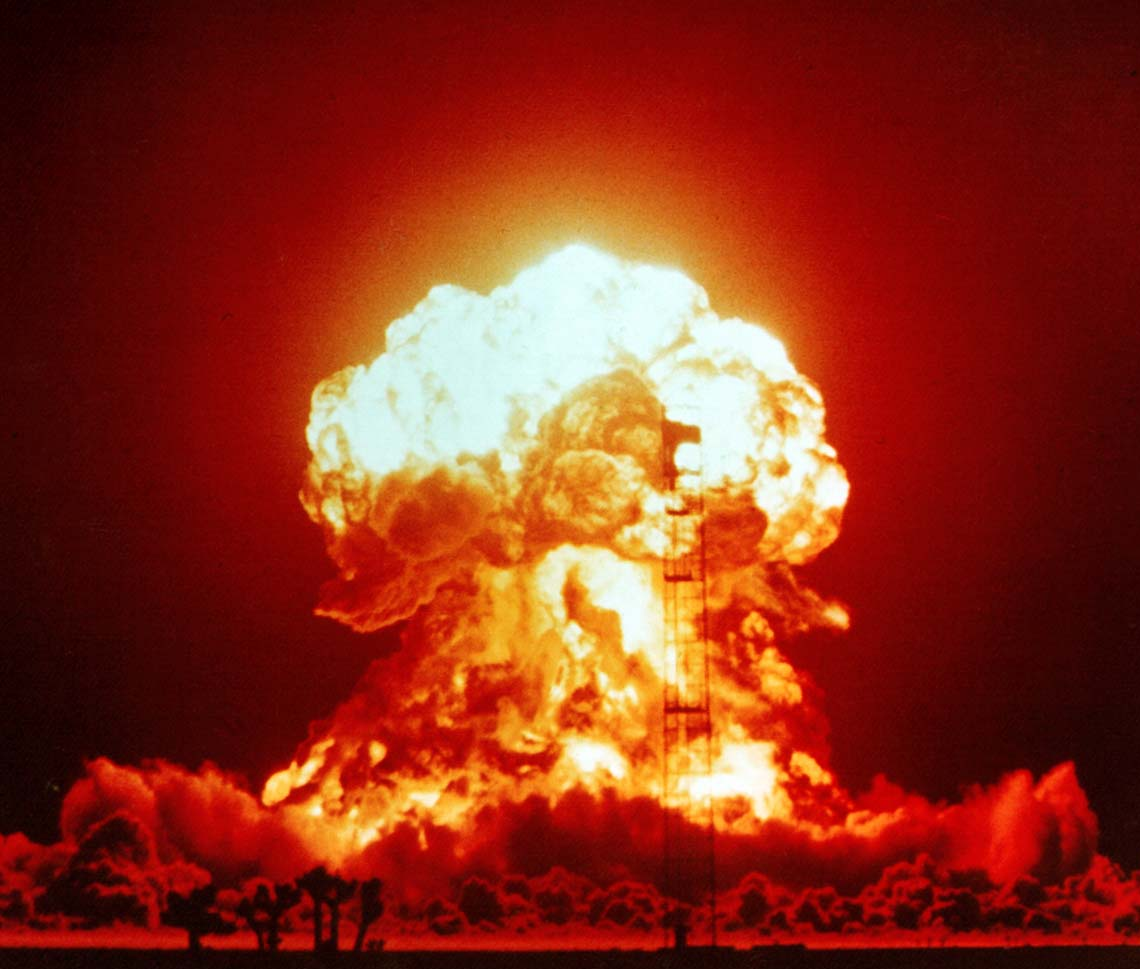
A nuclear fireball during a United States nuclear weapons test

Peace movements emerged in Japan, combining in 1954 to form the Japanese Council Against Atomic and Hydrogen Bombs. Japanese opposition to the Pacific nuclear-weapons tests was widespread, and an "estimated 35 million signatures were collected on petitions calling for bans on nuclear weapons".

In the United Kingdom, the Campaign for Nuclear Disarmament (CND) held an inaugural public meeting at Central Hall Westminster on 17 February 1958 which was attended by five thousand people. After the meeting, several hundred demonstrated at Downing Street.

The CND advocated the unconditional renunciation of the use, production, or dependence upon nuclear weapons by Britain, and the creation of a general disarmament convention. Although the country was progressing towards de-nuclearization, the CND declared that Britain should halt the flight of nuclear-armed planes, end nuclear testing, stop using missile bases, and not provide nuclear weapons to any other country.

The first Aldermaston March, organized by the CND, was held on Easter 1958. Several thousand people marched for four days from Trafalgar Square in London to the Atomic Weapons Research Establishment, near Aldermaston in Berkshire, to demonstrate their opposition to nuclear weapons. The Aldermaston marches continued into the late 1960s, when tens of thousands of people participated in the four-day marches. The CND tapped into the widespread popular fear of, and opposition to, nuclear weapons after the development of the first hydrogen bomb. During the late 1950s and early 1960s, anti-nuclear marches attracted large numbers of people.

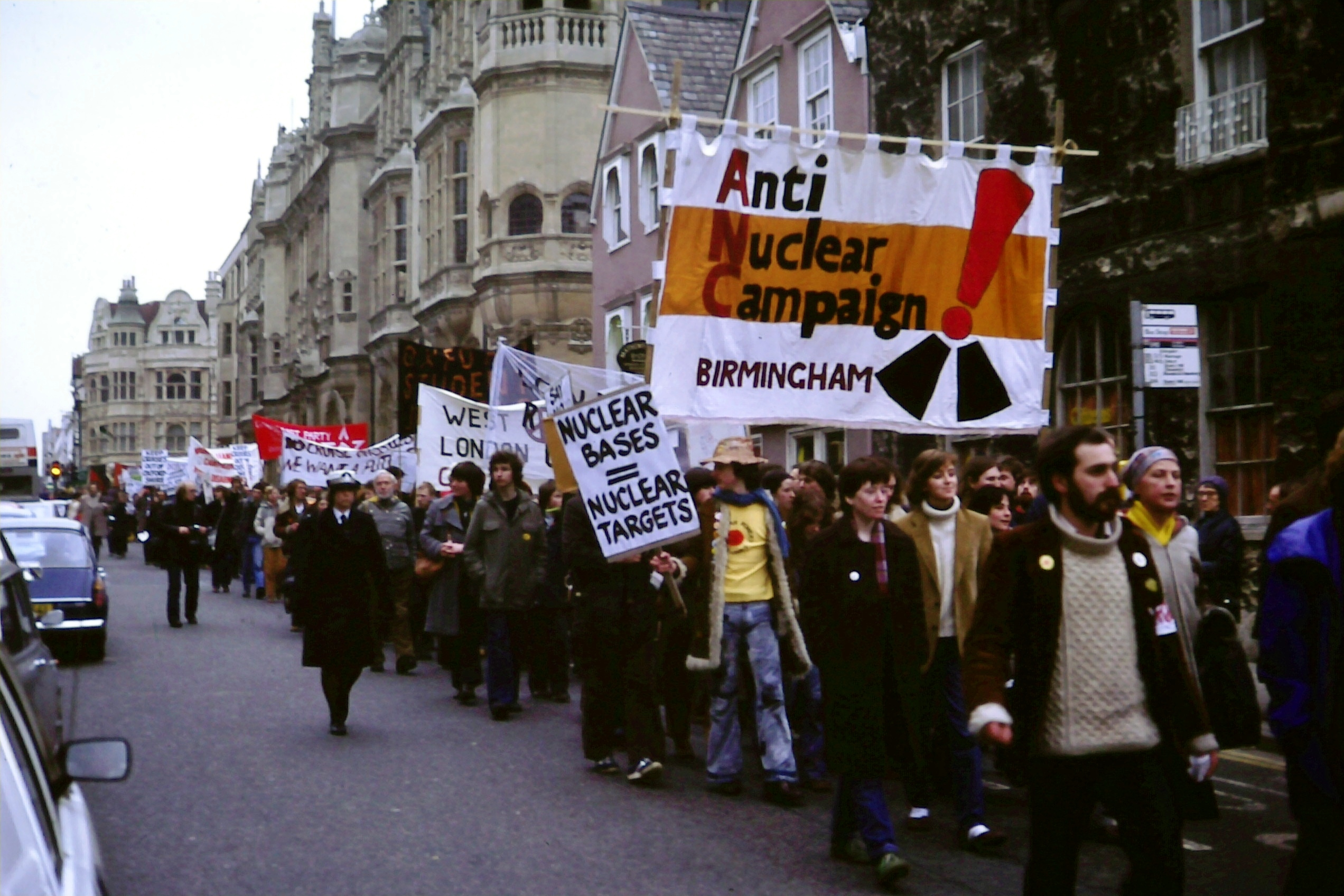
1980 anti-nuclear protest march in Oxford

Popular opposition to nuclear weapons produced a Labour Party resolution for unilateral nuclear disarmament at the 1960 party conference, but the resolution was overturned the following year and did not appear on later agendas. The experience disillusioned many anti-nuclear protesters who had previously put their hopes in the Labour Party.

Two years after the CND's formation, president Bertrand Russell resigned to form the Committee of 100; the committee planned to conduct sit-down demonstrations in central London and at nuclear bases around the UK. Russell said that the demonstrations were necessary because the press had become indifferent to the CND and large-scale, direct action could force the government to change its policy. One hundred prominent people, many in the arts, attached their names to the organization. Large numbers of demonstrators were essential to their strategy but police violence, the arrest and imprisonment of demonstrators, and preemptive arrests for conspiracy diminished support. Although several prominent people took part in sit-down demonstrations (including Russell, whose imprisonment at age 89 was widely reported), many of the 100 signatories were inactive.

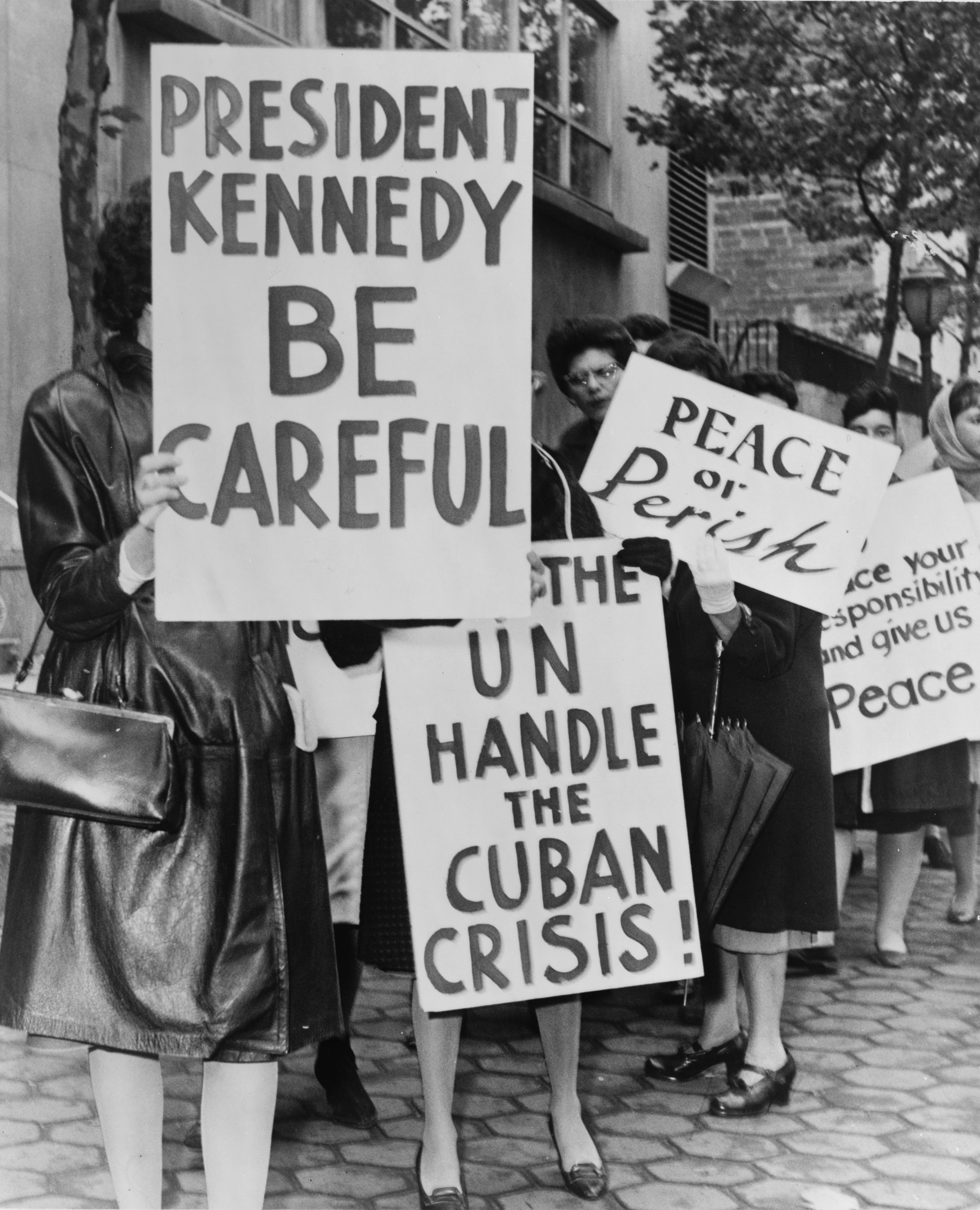
Members of Women Strike for Peace during the Cuban Missile Crisis

Since the Committee of 100 had a non-hierarchical structure and no formal membership, many local groups assumed the name. Although this helped civil disobedience to spread, it produced policy confusion; as the 1960s progressed, a number of Committee of 100 groups protested against social issues not directly related to war and peace.

In 1961, at the height of the Cold War, about 50,000 women brought together by Women Strike for Peace marched in 60 cities in the United States to demonstrate against nuclear weapons. It was the century's largest national women's peace protest.

In 1958, Linus Pauling and his wife presented the United Nations with a petition signed by more than 11,000 scientists calling for an end to nuclear weapons testing. The 1961 Baby Tooth Survey, co-founded by Dr. Louise Reiss, indicated that above-ground nuclear testing posed significant public health risks in the form of radioactive fallout spread primarily via milk from cows which ate contaminated grass. Public pressure and the research results then led to a moratorium on above ground nuclear weapons testing, followed by the Partial Nuclear Test Ban Treaty signed in 1963 by John F. Kennedy, Nikita Khrushchev, and Harold Macmillan. On the day that the treaty went into force, the Nobel Prize Committee awarded Pauling the Nobel Peace Prize: "Linus Carl Pauling, who ever since 1946 has campaigned ceaselessly, not only against nuclear weapons tests, not only against the spread of these armaments, not only against their very use but against all warfare as a means of solving international conflicts." Pauling founded the International League of Humanists in 1974; he was president of the scientific advisory board of the World Union for Protection of Life, and a signatory of the Dubrovnik-Philadelphia Statement.

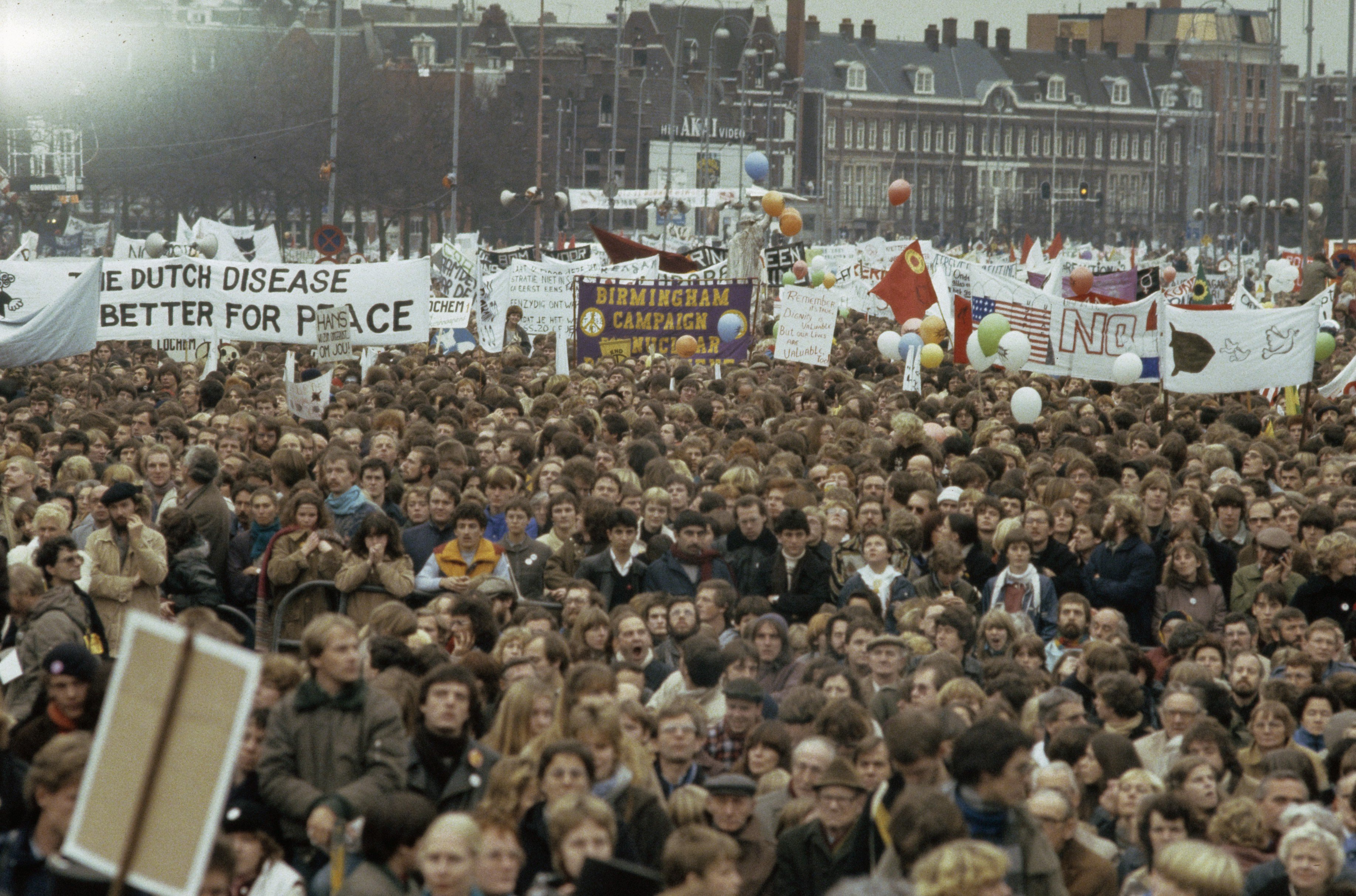
1981 protest in Amsterdam against the deployment of Pershing II missiles in Europe

On June 12, 1982, one million people demonstrated in New York City's Central Park against nuclear weapons and for an end to the Cold War arms race. It was the largest anti-nuclear protest and the largest political demonstration in American history. International Day of Nuclear-disarmament protests were held on June 20, 1983, at 50 locations across the United States. In 1986, hundreds of people walked from Los Angeles to Washington, D.C. in the Great Peace March for Global Nuclear Disarmament. Many Nevada Desert Experience protests and peace camps were held at the Nevada Test Site during the 1980s and 1990s.

Forty thousand anti-nuclear and anti-war protesters marched past the United Nations in New York on May 1, 2005, 60 years after the atomic bombings of Hiroshima and Nagasaki. The protest was the largest anti-nuclear rally in the U.S. for several decades. In Britain, there were many protests against the government's proposal to replace the aging Trident weapons system with newer missiles. The largest of the protests had 100,000 participants and, according to polls, 59 percent of the public opposed the move.

The International Conference on Nuclear Disarmament, held in Oslo in February 2008, was organized by the government of Norway, the Nuclear Threat Initiative, and the Hoover Institute. The conference, entitled "Achieving the Vision of a World Free of Nuclear Weapons", was intended to build consensus between states with and without nuclear weapons in the context of the Treaty on the Non-Proliferation of Nuclear Weapons. In May 2010, 25,000 people (including members of peace organizations and 1945 atomic-bomb survivors) marched for about two kilometers from lower Manhattan to United Nations headquarters calling for the elimination of nuclear weapons.

=== Vietnam War protests ===
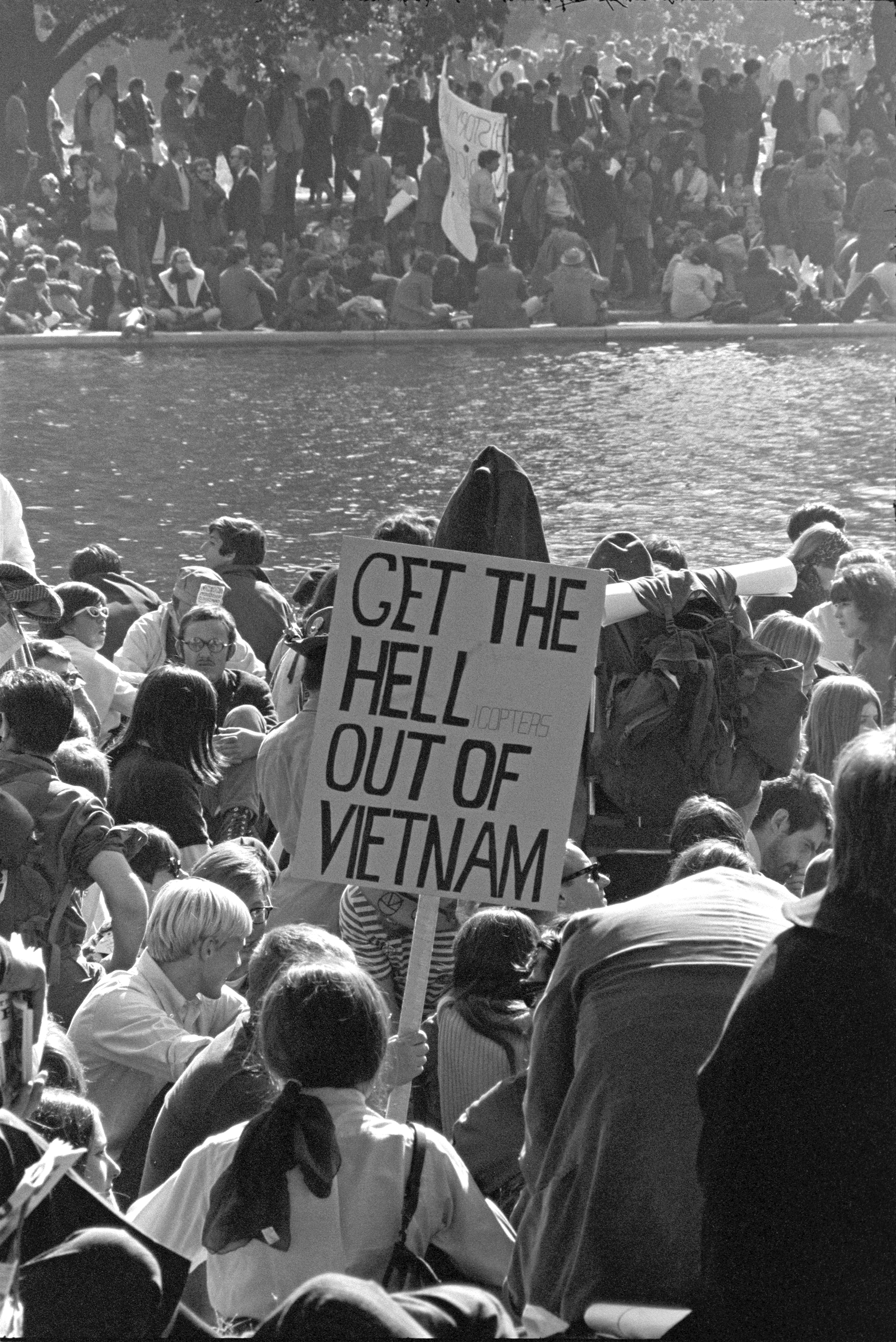
Protesters against the Vietnam War prepare to march on the Pentagon on October 21, 1967.

The anti-Vietnam War peace movement began during the 1960s in the United States, opposing U.S. involvement in the Vietnam War. Some within the movement advocated a unilateral withdrawal of American forces from South Vietnam.

Opposition to the Vietnam War aimed to unite groups opposed to U.S. anti-communism, imperialism, capitalism and colonialism, such as New Left groups and the Catholic Worker Movement. Others, such as Stephen Spiro, opposed the war based on the just war theory.

In 1965, the movement began to gain national prominence. Provocative actions by police and protesters turned anti-war demonstrations in Chicago at the 1968 Democratic National Convention into a riot. News reports of American military abuses such as the 1968 My Lai massacre brought attention (and support) to the anti-war movement, which continued to expand for the duration of the conflict.

High-profile opposition to the Vietnam war turned to street protests in an effort to turn U.S. political opinion against the war. The protests gained momentum from the civil rights movement, which had organized to oppose segregation laws. They were fueled by a growing network of underground newspapers and large rock festivals, such as Woodstock. Opposition to the war moved from college campuses to middle-class suburbs, government institutions, and labor unions.

=== Europe in 1980s ===
A very large peace movement emerged in East and West Europe in the 1980s, primarily in opposition to American plans to fight the Cold War by stationing nuclear missiles in Europe. Moscow supported the movement behind the scenes, but did not control it. However, communist-sponsored peace movements in Eastern Europe metamorphosed into genuine peace movements calling not only for détente, but for democracy. According to Hania Fedorowicz, they played an important role in East Germany and other countries in resurrecting civil society, and helped instigate the successful 1989 peaceful revolutions in Eastern Europe.

== Peace movements by country ==
=== Australia ===
The first significant peace organisations emerged in 1899 after Australia sent troops to help the United Kingdom fight the Boer War in South Africa. The Melbourne Peace and Humanity Society (PHS) was founded in 1900, followed by the Anti-War League (AWL) in New South Wales in 1902. The Melbourne Peace Society (MPS) was established in 1905, with similar groups forming in other cities. Women played important roles, though mostly in organisational rather than leadership capacities. Notable early female leaders included Rose Scott and Marian Harwood.

With the outbreak of World War I in 1914, the Australian Peace Alliance (APA) was formed in 1914, initially with 13 affiliated groups, growing to 54 by 1918. The APA included pacifists, socialists, liberal Christians, trade unions, and women’s groups such as the Sisterhood of International Peace (SIP) and the Women’s Peace Army (WPA). The anti-conscription movement was a major focus during WWI, with groups like the No-Conscription Fellowship supporting conscientious objectors The peace movement diversified, with Christian pacifists and secular organisations like the League of Nations Union (LNU) and the Victorian Council Against War and Fascism (VCAWF) working together.

The rise of fascism and the approach of WWII caused divisions within the movement, particularly between absolute pacifists and those who supported collective security against aggression. Women’s groups, especially the Women’s International League for Peace and Freedom (WILPF), played a prominent role in international disarmament campaigns, including a major petition in 1931.

The peace movement was revitalised in the 1960s, primarily in opposition to the Vietnam War and conscription. The Campaign for Nuclear Disarmament (CND) was founded in 1960, later merging into the broader anti-Vietnam War movement.

=== Canada ===
Canadian pacifist Agnes Macphail was the first woman elected to the House of Commons. Macphail objected to the Royal Military College of Canada in 1931 on pacifist grounds. Macphail was also the first female Canadian delegate to the League of Nations, where she worked with the World Disarmament Committee. Despite her pacifism, she voted for Canada to enter World War II. The Canadian Peace Congress (1949–1990) was a leading organizer of the Canadian peace movement, particularly under the leadership of James Gareth Endicott (its president until 1971).

For over a century Canada has had a diverse peace movement, with coalitions and networks in many cities, towns, and regions. The largest national umbrella organization is the Canadian Peace Alliance, whose 140 member groups include large city-based coalitions, small grassroots groups, national and local unions and faith, environmental and student groups for a combined membership of over four million. The alliance and its member groups have led opposition to the war on terror. The CPA opposed Canada's participation in the war in Afghanistan and Canadian complicity in what it views as misguided and destructive United States foreign policy. Canada has also been home to a growing movement of Palestinian solidarity, marked by an increasing number of grassroots Jewish groups opposed to Israeli policies.

=== Germany ===
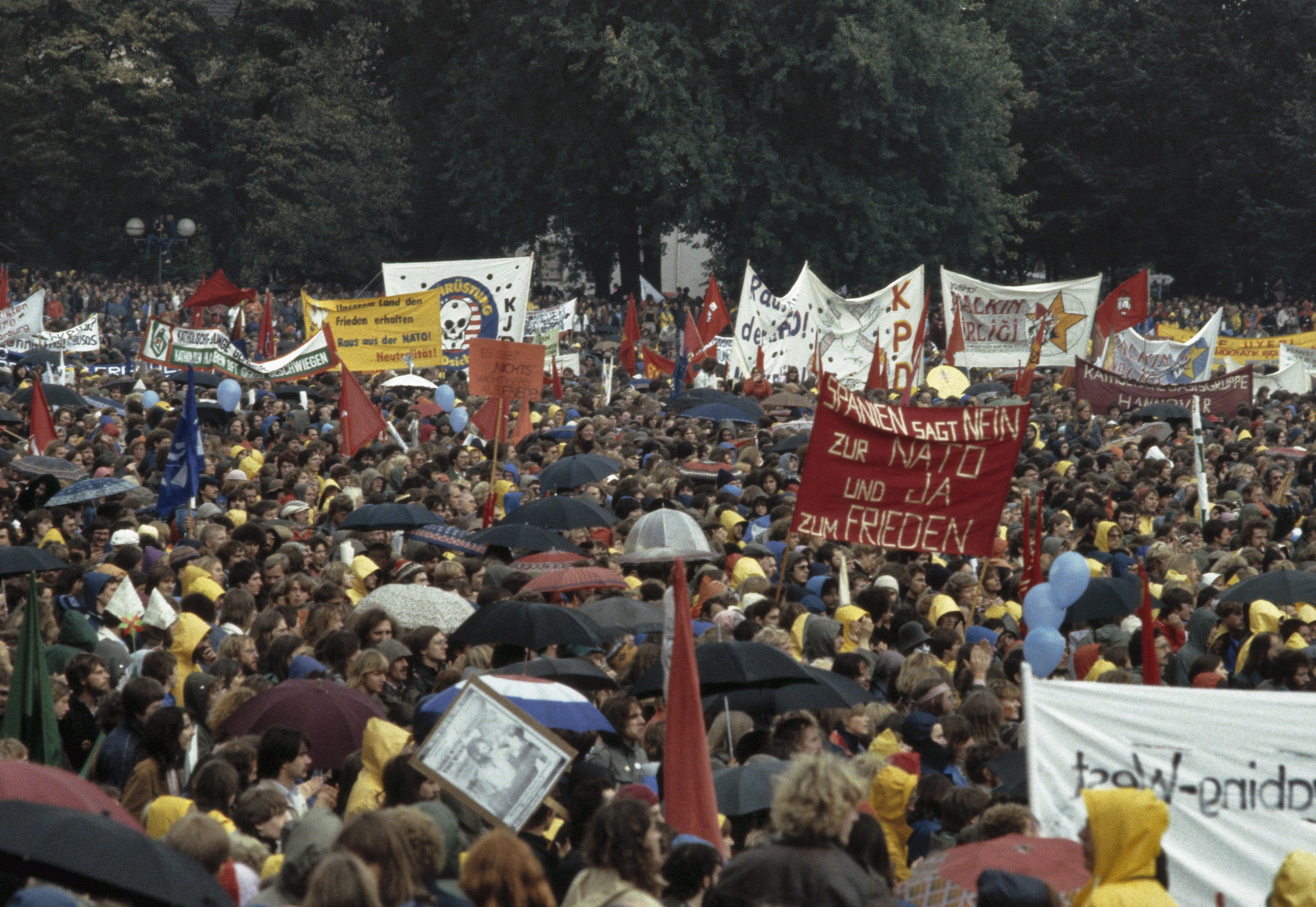
1981 protest in Bonn against the nuclear arms race between NATO and the Soviet Union

Germany developed a strong pacifist movement in the late 19th century; it was suppressed during the Nazi era. After 1945 in East Germany it was controlled by the communist government.

During the Cold War (1947–1989), the West German peace movement concentrated on the abolition of nuclear technology (particularly nuclear weapons) from West Germany and Europe. Most activists criticized both the United States and the Soviet Union. According to conservative critics, the movement had been infiltrated by Stasi agents.

After 1989, the ideal of peace was espoused by Green parties across Europe. Peace sometimes played a significant role in policy-making; in 2002, the German Greens convinced Chancellor Gerhard Schröder to oppose German involvement in Iraq. The Greens controlled the German Foreign Ministry under Joschka Fischer (a Green, and Germany's most popular politician at the time), who sought to limit German involvement in the war on terror. He joined French President Jacques Chirac, whose opposition was decisive in the UN Security Council resolution to limit support for the 2003 invasion of Iraq.

=== India ===
The world's longest peaceful movement was the Bijolia movement, which continued for 44 years.

=== Israel ===
Israeli–Palestinian and Arab–Israeli conflicts have existed since the dawn of Zionism, particularly since the 1948 formation of the state of Israel and the 1967 Six-Day War. The mainstream peace movement in Israel is Peace Now (Shalom Akhshav), which tends to support the Labour Party or Meretz. After the Second intifada and Palestinian rejections of peace proposals, Tamar Hermann, director of the Guttman Center for Public Opinion and Policy Research at the Israel Democracy Institute said that Israelis began to lose faith in the feasibility of peace although Israelis support the idea of peace.

Peace Now was founded in the aftermath of Egyptian President Anwar Sadat's visit to Jerusalem, when it was felt that an opportunity for peace could be missed. Prime Minister Menachem Begin acknowledged that on the eve of his departure for the Camp David summit with Sadat and US President Jimmy Carter, Peace Now rallies in Tel Aviv (which drew a crowd of 100,000, the largest peace rally in Israel to date) played a major role in his decision to withdraw from the Sinai Peninsula and dismantle Israeli settlements there. Peace Now supported Begin for a time and hailed him as a peacemaker, but turned against him when the Sinai withdrawal was accompanied by an accelerated campaign of land confiscation and settlement-building on the West Bank.

Peace Now advocates a negotiated peace with the Palestinians. This was originally worded vaguely, with no definition of "the Palestinians" and who represents them. Peace Now was slow to join the dialogue with the PLO begun by groups such as the Israeli Council for Israeli-Palestinian Peace and the Hadash coalition; only in 1988 did the group accept that the PLO is the body regarded by the Palestinians as their representative.

During the First Intifada, Peace Now held a number of rallies to protest the Israeli army and call for a negotiated withdrawal from the Palestinian territories; the group attacked Defence Minister Yitzhak Rabin for his hard-line stance. After Rabin became prime minister, signed the Oslo Agreement and shook Yasser Arafat's hand on the White House lawn, however, Peace Now mobilized strong public support for him. Since Rabin's November 1995 assassination, rallies on the anniversary of his death (organized by the Rabin Family Foundation) have become the Israeli peace movement's main event. Peace Now is currently known for its struggle against the expansion of settlement outposts on the West Bank.

Gush Shalom (the Peace Bloc) is a left-wing group which developed from the Jewish-Arab Committee Against Deportations, which protested the deportation without trial of 415 Palestinian activists to Lebanon in December 1992 and put up a protest tent in front of the prime minister's office in Jerusalem for two months until the government allowed the deportees to return. The committee then decided to continue as a general peace movement opposing the occupation and advocating the creation of an independent Palestine side-by-side with Israel in its pre-1967 borders, with an undivided Jerusalem the capital of both states. Gush Shalom is also descended from the Israeli Council for Israeli-Palestinian Peace (ICIPP), founded in 1975. Its founders included a group of dissidents which included Major-General Mattityahu Peled, a member of the IDF General Staff during the 1967 Six-Day War; economist Ya'akov Arnon, who headed the Zionist Federation in the Netherlands before coming to Israel in 1948 and the former director-general of the Israeli Ministry of Finance and board chair of the Israeli Electricity Company; and Aryeh Eliav, Labour Party secretary-general until he broke with the Prime Minister Golda Meir over Palestinian issues. The ICIPP's founders joined a group of young, grassroots peace activists who had been active against Israeli occupation since 1967. The bridge between them was journalist and former Knesset member Uri Avnery. Its main achievement was the opening of dialogue with the Palestine Liberation Organization (PLO). Gush Shalom activists are currently involved in the daily struggle in Palestinian villages which have had their land confiscated by the West Bank barrier. They and members of other Israeli movements such as Ta'ayush and Anarchists Against the Wall joining Palestinian villagers in Bil'in in weekly marches to protest the village's land confiscation.

After the 2014 Gaza War, a group of Israeli women founded Women Wage Peace with the goal of reaching a "bilaterally acceptable" peace agreement between Israel and Palestine. The movement has worked to build connections with Palestinians, reaching out to women and men from a variety of religions and political backgrounds. Its activities have included a collective hunger strike outside Israeli Prime Minister Benjamin Netanyahu's residence and a protest march from Northern Israel to Jerusalem. In May 2017, Women Wage Peace had over 20,000 members and supporters.

=== New Zealand ===
Notable peace activists include Sonya Davies, Kate Dewes, Elsie Locke, Maire Leadbeater, Bunny McDairmid, Laurie Salas, and Jools and Lynda Topp.

This small Pacific nation has a strong aspiration for global peace, rooted in the Māori principle of Rongomaraeroa (the Long Pathway to Peace). New Zealand women who were part of the suffrage movement played a significant role in establishing the World Court, a permanent arbitration court for peaceful resolution of international disputes. Stories of the horrors recounted by soldiers and nurses returning from both world wars, along with the impact of the atomic bombings of Hiroshima and Nagasaki, deeply ingrained the nation's commitment to peace. Military involvement in subsequent conflicts has primarily focused on peacekeeping, non-combat training, logistical support, medical assistance, and post-war reconstruction teams.

In response to these events, a peace movement emerged, starting from grassroots groups like CORSO across the country, with Christchurch being a prominent hub. Christchurch was the first city in New Zealand to be declared nuclear-free and became the nation's inaugural peace city in 2002. The city's botanical gardens are home to a world peace bell and a peace train. During the 1980s, the Sumner Peace Group, Rangiora Peace Group, and Lyttelton Peace Group were active advocates for peace, supporting various causes such as Citizens for Demilitarisation of Harewood, Campaign Against Foreign Control of Aotearoa, and Anti-Bases Campaign.

In 1973, the 'Battle of Harewood' saw individuals from peace movements protesting at two Operation Deep Freeze air defence bases at Harewood Airport and the nearby Weedons Stores Depot. Twenty-three individuals were arrested during the clashes. This event could be seen as a precursor to the protests at Waihopai Station spy-base and the unrest during the 1981 Springbok Tour.

The Cuban missile crisis and sinking of the Rainbow Warrior by France strengthened the country's nuclear-free stance and garnered bipartisan support. This depth of sentiment remains robust today. As recently as 2024, Foreign Minister Winston Peters emphasized the importance of seeking peaceful solutions, highlighting the lesson learned from the Second World War that dialogue is preferable to conflict.

=== United Kingdom ===
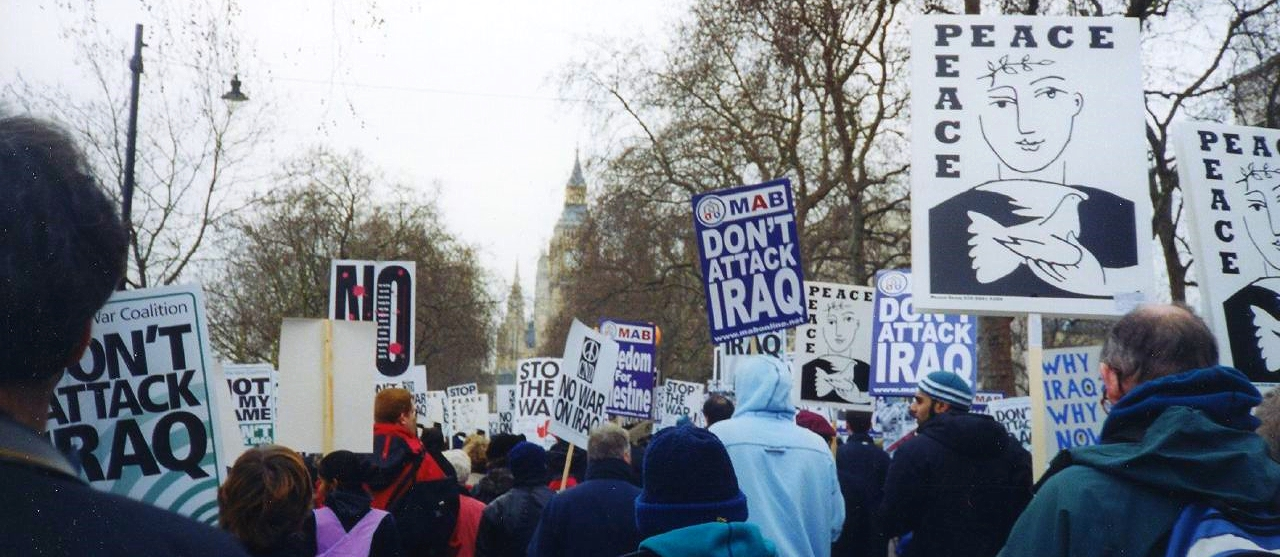
Protesters against the Iraq War in London

From 1934 the Peace Pledge Union gained many adherents to its pledge "I renounce war and will never support or sanction another." Its support diminished considerably with the outbreak of war in 1939, but it remained the focus of pacifism in the post-war years.

After World War II, peace efforts in the United Kingdom were initially focused on the dissolution of the British Empire and the rejection of imperialism by the United States and the Soviet Union. The anti-nuclear movement sought to opt out of the Cold War, rejecting "Britain's Little Independent Nuclear Deterrent" (BLIND) on the grounds that it contradicted mutual assured destruction.

Although the Vietnam Solidarity Campaign, (VSC, led by Tariq Ali) led several large demonstrations against the Vietnam War in 1967 and 1968, the first anti-Vietnam demonstration was at the American Embassy in London in 1965. In 1976, the Lucas Plan (led by Mike Cooley) sought to transform production at Lucas Aerospace from arms to socially-useful production.

The peace movement was later associated with peace camps, as the Labour Party moved to the center under Prime Minister Tony Blair. By early 2003, the peace and anti-war movements (grouped as the Stop the War Coalition) were powerful enough to cause several of Blair's cabinet to resign and hundreds of Labour MPs to vote against their government. Blair's motion to support the U.S. plan to invade Iraq continued due to support from the Conservative Party. Protests against the Iraq War were particularly vocal in Britain. Polls suggested that without UN Security Council approval, the UK public was opposed to involvement. Over two million people protested in Hyde Park; the previous largest demonstration in the UK had about 600,000 participants.

The primary function of the National Peace Council was to provide opportunities for consultation and joint activities by its affiliated members, to help inform public opinion on the issues of the day, and to convey to the government the views of its members. The NPC disbanded in 2000 and was replaced the following year by the "Network for Peace", set up to continue the NPC's networking role.

=== United States ===
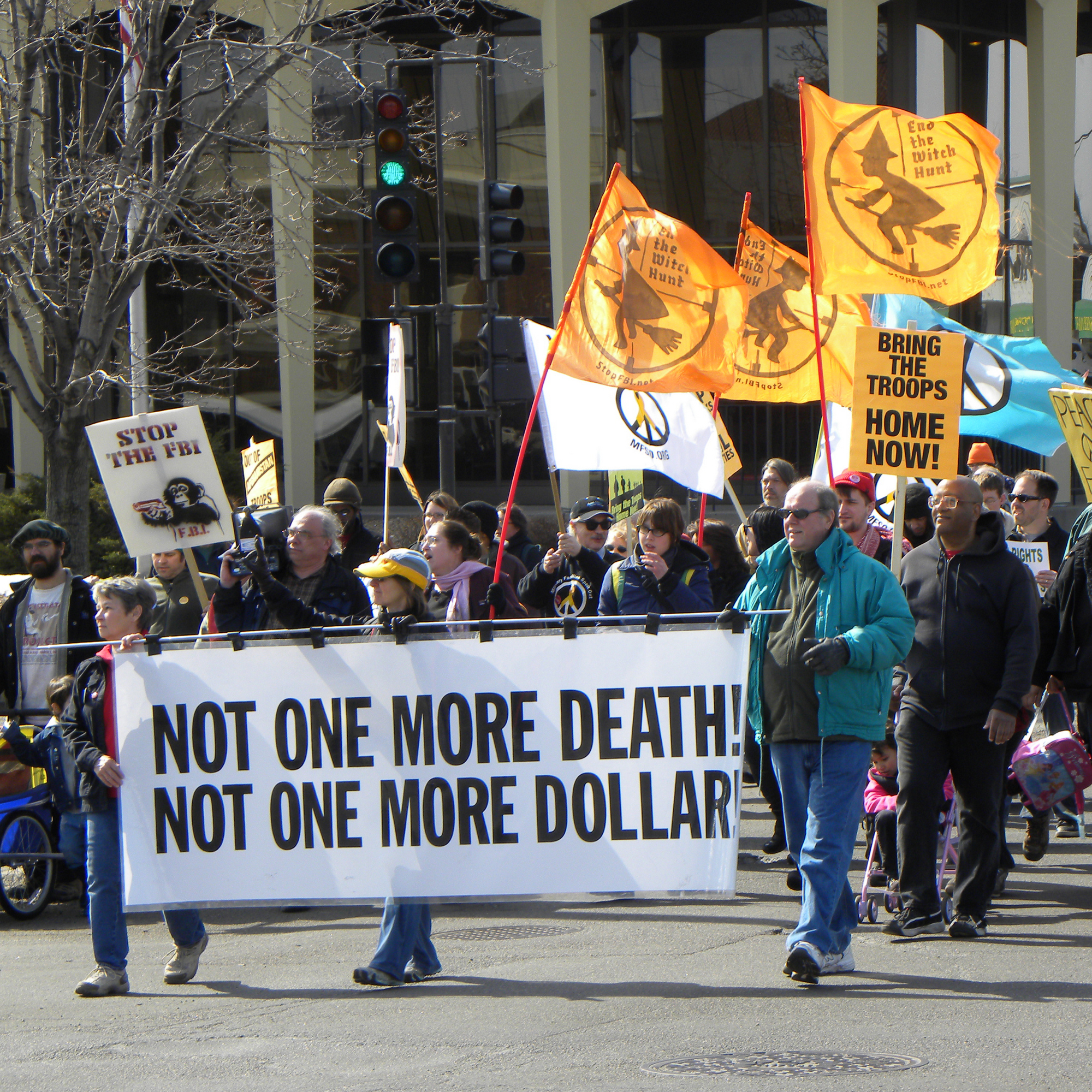
Anti-war march in St. Paul, Minnesota, March 19, 2011

Near the end of the Cold War, U.S. peace activists focused on slowing the nuclear arms race in the hope of reducing the possibility of nuclear war between the U.S. and the USSR. As the Reagan administration accelerated military spending and adopted a tough stance toward Russia, the Nuclear Freeze campaign and Beyond War movement sought to educate the public on the inherent risk and cost of Reagan's policy. Outreach to individual citizens in the Soviet Union and mass meetings using satellite-link technology were major parts of peacemaking activity during the 1980s. In 1981, the activist Thomas began the longest uninterrupted peace vigil in U.S. history. He was later joined at Lafayette Square in Washington, D.C. by anti-nuclear activists Concepción Picciotto and Ellen Thomas.

In response to Iraq's invasion of Kuwait in 1990, President George H. W. Bush began preparing for war in the region. Peace activists were starting to gain traction with popular rallies, especially on the West Coast, just before the Gulf War began in February 1991. The ground war ended in less than a week with a lopsided Allied victory, and a media-incited wave of patriotic sentiment washed over the nascent protest movement.

During the 1990s, peacemaker priorities included seeking a solution to the Israeli–Palestinian impasse, belated efforts at humanitarian assistance to war-torn regions such as Bosnia and Rwanda, and aid to post-war Iraq. American peace activists brought medicine into Iraq in defiance of U.S. law, resulting in heavy fines and imprisonment for some. The principal groups involved included Voices in the Wilderness and the Fellowship of Reconciliation.

Before and after the Iraq War began in 2003, a concerted protest effort was formed in the United States. A series of protests across the globe was held on February 15, 2003, with events in about 800 cities. The following month, just before the American- and British-led invasion of Iraq, "The World Says No to War" protest attracted as many as 500,000 protestors to cities across the U.S. After the war ended, many protest organizations persisted because of the American military and corporate presence in Iraq.

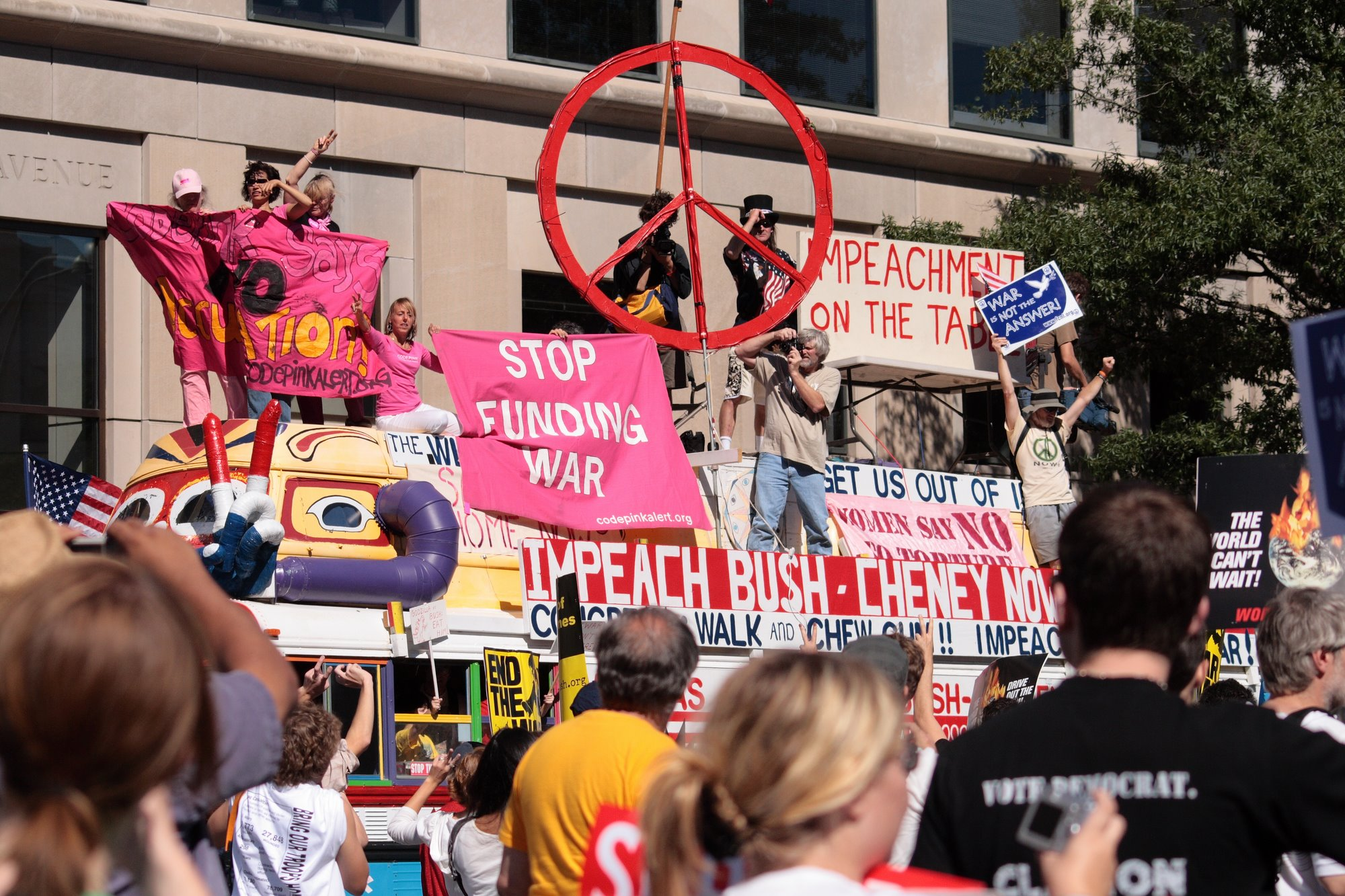
Protesters against the Iraq War in Washington, D.C., in 2007

American activist groups, including United for Peace and Justice, Code Pink (Women Say No To War), Iraq Veterans Against the War, Military Families Speak Out (MFSO), Not in Our Name, A.N.S.W.E.R., Veterans for Peace, and The World Can't Wait continued to protest against the Iraq War. Protest methods included rallies and marches, impeachment petitions, the staging of a war-crimes tribunal in New York to investigate crimes and alleged abuses of power by the Bush administration, bringing Iraqi women to the U.S. to tell their side of the story, independent filmmaking, high-profile appearances by anti-war activists such as Scott Ritter, Janis Karpinski, and Dahr Jamail, resisting military recruiting on college campuses, withholding taxes, mass letter-writing to legislators and newspapers, blogging, music, and guerrilla theatre. Independent media producers continued to broadcast, podcast, and web-host programs about the anti-war movement.

The Campaign Against Sanctions and Military Intervention in Iran was founded in late 2005. By August 2007, fears of an imminent United States or Israeli attack on Iran had increased to such a level that Nobel Prize winners Shirin Ebadi (2003 Peace Prize), Mairead Corrigan-Maguire and Betty Williams (joint 1976 Peace Prize), Harold Pinter (Literature 2005), Jody Williams (1997 Peace Prize) and anti-war groups including the Israeli Committee for a Middle East Free from Atomic, Biological and Chemical Weapons, the Campaign for Nuclear Disarmament, CASMII and Code Pink warned about what they considered the threat of a "war of an unprecedented scale, this time against Iran", Expressing concern that an attack on Iran with nuclear weapons had "not been ruled out", they called for "the dispute about Iran's nuclear program, to be resolved through peaceful means" and for Israel, "as the only Middle Eastern state suspected of possession of nuclear weapons", to join the Nuclear Non-Proliferation Treaty.

Although President Barack Obama continued the wars in Afghanistan and Iraq, attendance at peace marches "declined precipitously". Social scientists Michael T. Heaney and Fabio Rojas noted that from 2007 to 2009, "the largest antiwar rallies shrank from hundreds of thousands of people to thousands, and then to only hundreds."

== See also ==
- American Friends Service Committee
- Appeasement
- Capitalist peace
- Carnegie Endowment for International Peace
- Global peace system
- Imagine Piano Peace Project
- International Fellowship of Reconciliation
- Service Civil International
- International Campaign to Abolish Nuclear Weapons
- International Day for the Total Elimination of Nuclear Weapons
- International security
- List of anti-war organizations
- List of peace activists
- Make love, not war
- Opposition to World War I
- Opposition to World War II
- Opposition to the Iraq War
- Opposition to the War in Afghanistan (2001–2021)
- Pacifism
  - Pacifism in the United States
  - Pacifism in Germany
- Peace and conflict studies
- Peace Organisation of Australia
- Peace Pledge Union, in UK
- Peace symbols
  - Peace flag
- Peace Ship
- Peaceworker
  - List of peace activists
- Right of conquest
- Soviet influence on the peace movement
- Women's International League for Peace and Freedom
- World peace
