= Hanighen =

Hanighen is a surname. Notable people with the surname include:

- Bernie Hanighen (1908–1976), American songwriter and record producer
- Frank Hanighen (1899–1964), American journalist
