= Cash and carry (World War II) =

United States World War II policy

Cash and Carry was a policy by US President Franklin Delano Roosevelt announced at a joint session of the United States Congress on September 21, 1939, subsequent to the outbreak of war in Europe. It replaced the Neutrality Act of 1937, by which belligerents could purchase only nonmilitary goods from the United States as long as the recipients paid immediately in cash and assumed all risk in transportation using their own ships. A later revision, the Neutrality Act of 1939, allowed the sale of military arms to belligerents on the same cash-and-carry basis.

== History ==
=== Background ===
Because of the conclusion of the Nye Committee, which asserted that United States involvement in World War I was driven by private interests from arms manufacturers, many Americans believed that investment in a belligerent would eventually lead to American participation in war. The first Neutrality Act was passed in August 1935. It was renewed in 1936 and later extended to May 1937. The Act forbade selling implements of war or lending money to belligerent countries under any terms. US passengers traveling on foreign ships were advised that they did so at their own risk.

The Neutrality Act of 1937 continued this policy, and in addition, forbade U.S. citizens from traveling on belligerent ships. However, belligerent countries could purchase non-military items provided they paid cash and the goods were not transported on American ships. (Raw materials such as oil were not considered "implements of war".) Roosevelt arranged the inclusion of the "cash and carry" clause "...as a deliberate way to assist Great Britain and France in any war against the Axis Powers, since he realized that they were the only countries that had both the hard currency and ships to make use of "cash-and-carry." The clause was set to expire after two years.

=== Neutrality Act of 1939 ===
By the spring of 1939, Roosevelt wanted more flexibility in dealing with the militaristic policies of Germany, Japan, and Italy. Originally presented to Congress by Senator Key Pittman (D-NV) earlier in 1939, the bill was designed to replace the Neutrality Act of 1937, which had lapsed in May 1939.

The bill had been defeated repeatedly by the Senate and the House on more than one occasion as Isolationists feared that passing the bill would draw the US into the conflict in Europe and Asia. However, after Germany invaded Poland in September 1939, the position of many in Congress changed. Senator George W. Norris said, "If we repeal it, we are helping England and France. If we fail to repeal it, we will be helping Hitler and his allies. Absolute neutrality is an impossibility."

On November 2, the House passed the Pittman Act repealing provisions of the 1935 act by a vote of 243 to 181. The President gave his signature on November 4. The Act continued the prohibition of making loans to belligerents and the use of American ships, but lifted the ban on arms sales.

The purpose of this policy was to allow the Allied nations at war with Germany to purchase war materials while maintaining a semblance of neutrality for the United States. Coming out of the Great Depression, the U.S. economy was rebounding. Further growth in manufacturing would propel the economy forward. The cash and carry program stimulated U.S. manufacturing while allowing the Allied nations, particularly the United Kingdom, to purchase much needed military equipment.

The "cash and carry" legislation enacted in 1939 effectively ended the arms embargo that had been in place since the Neutrality Act of 1936, and paved the way for Roosevelt's Lend-Lease program.

== See also ==
- British Purchasing Commission
