= Merchants of death =

Pejorative term for the arms industry and international bankers

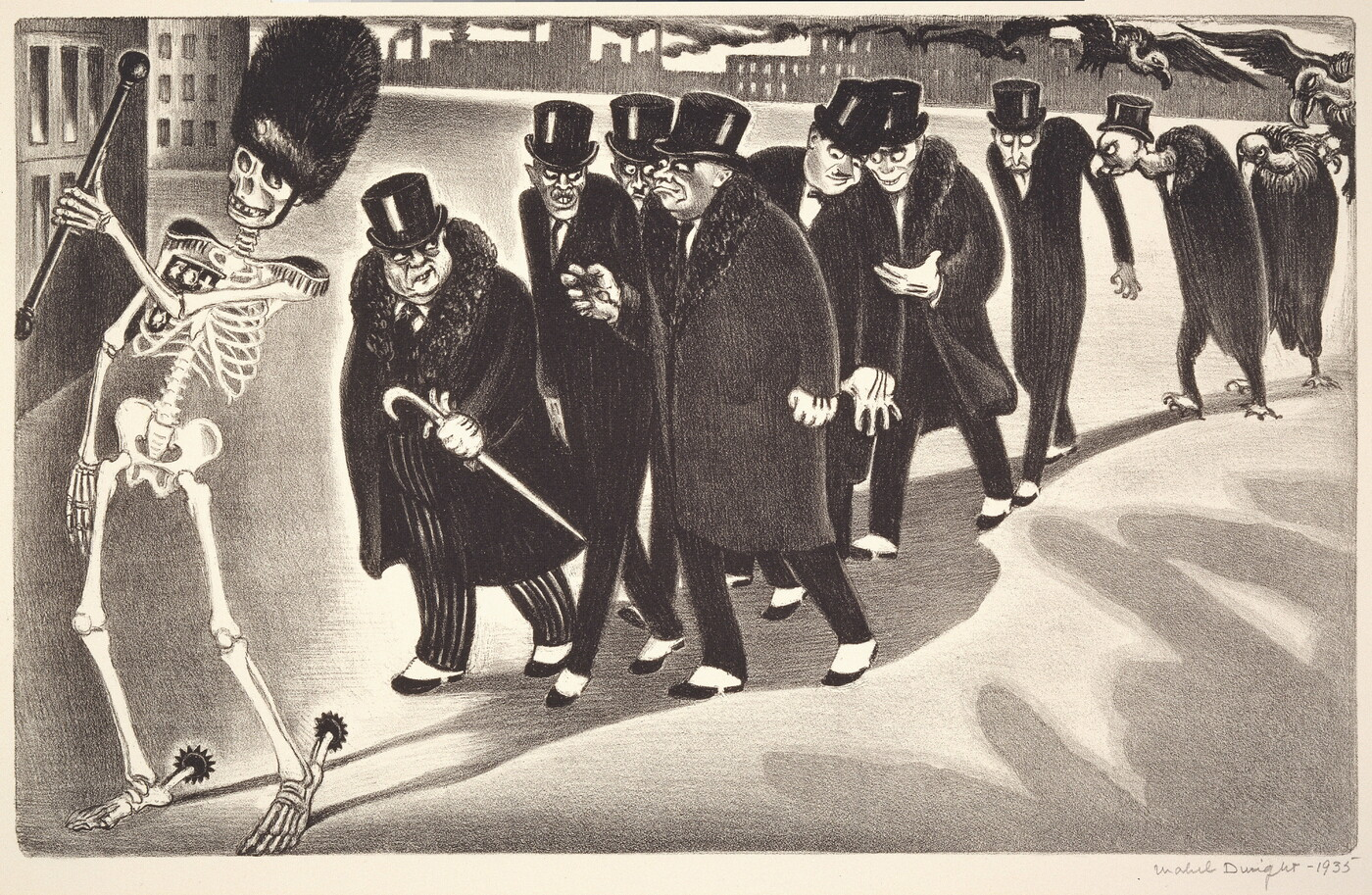
1935 lithograph titled Merchants of Death by socialist printmaker Mabel Dwight

Merchants of death is a pejorative term that refers primarily to the arms industry, and sometimes to international bankers. The term originated during the Great Depression, following the devastation of World War I, and arose from the belief that the international munitions industry had conspired to control the fate of nations via improper influence over government officials. The purpose of this alleged conspiracy was said to be the extraction of business profits from human death. During peacetime, the conspirators allegedly would stir up antagonism and war between nations so that they could then arm the combatants and line their pockets with the proceeds.

== Usage ==
Merchants of death is generally considered a derogatory term by scholars. Some anti-war activists who use the term acknowledge that it is considered pejorative.

In addition to its use as a derogatory term, "merchants of death" also refers to a conspiracy theory which asserts that war is caused by artificial conflicts stirred up by arms makers and bankers for their own profit. The first use of the term occurred during the Great Depression and it quickly achieved popularity during the lead-up to WWII.

A very comforting myth has evolved through the years to account for mankind's penchant for self-destruction. War can be blamed squarely on two elements of society that are limited in number, highly visible, and unloved—the munitions makers and their associates, the international bankers. These devils have come to be known collectively as "merchants of death," although the term is quite often applied to the munitions makers alone.

— Anne Trotter

Although a few cases of unethical behavior on the part of arms makers around the year 1900 influenced the later birth of the term, the allegations of conspiracy that were widely alleged under the moniker merchants of death were found to be baseless by the Nye Committee and subsequent investigations.

The term became popular once again during the Vietnam War at the same time that the similar phrase military-industrial complex first achieved common usage. Military-industrial complex is likewise almost always pejorative and carries sinister overtones.

== History of the theory ==
Popular anxiety that a ruler may lead a nation into war for his own self-interests has a long history dating to the dawn of society. However, criticism of arms makers is a modern phenomenon originating in the Industrial Revolution. Armorers were well-to-do artisans in Ancient Greece and Rome through the Middle Ages in European towns known for arms making such as Toledo, Milan, Nuremberg, and Liège. But ancient armorers remained firmly in the class of respectable artisans rather than rising to become wealthy businessmen.

Animosity towards the arms industry became a matter of public debate at the start of the 20th century. Socialists began blaming war on capitalists at the Second International where they took up the cause of antimilitarism and J. A. Hobson claimed in 1902 that wars are started by businessmen feigning national antagonisms which have no basis in reality. A fictional arms manufacturer was portrayed negatively in the 1905 play Major Barbara with lines like You will make war when it suits us, and keep peace when it doesn’t The international peace movement first focused attention on large European arms makers such as Schneider-Creusot, Krupp, Vickers, Armstrong Whitworth, and Škoda around the time of the Second Hague Conference in 1907.

Following the Anglo-German Naval Race of 1909, public criticism of munitions makers increased in England. The War Traders by George Perris influenced intellectuals and socialists to begin discussing nationalization of munitions makers to put them under public control. The attacks on the arms industry just prior to WWI had all the elements of the merchants of death theory that erupted 20 years later. These included charges of war scares fomented by industry, international arms cartels, manipulation of the news media, and conflicts of interest in government procurement. These claims were promoted by pamphlets such as National Labour Press’s The War Trust Exposed, Union of Democratic Control’s The International Industry of War, National Peace Council’s The War Traders, and World Peace Foundation’s Syndicates for War and Dreadnoughts and Dividends.

there is a powerful group of capitalists, closely allied to the fighting services, firmly entrenched in society, and well served by politicians and journalists, whose business it is to exploit the rivalries and jealousies of nations.

— H.N. Brailsford 1914

Conflict between the peace movement and the Navy League of the United States broke out in the lead-up to WWI when Clyde H. Tavenner accused the League of being a front for the vested interests of its officers and arms makers. Tavenner called for nationalization of the arms industries in a speech in the United States House of Representatives. Progressives in America began targeting arms makers as a subset of their more general enemies of big business and bankers. An early victory in this fight was a prohibition on loans to the belligerents by Secretary of State William Jennings Bryan, though that was reversed the following year by his successor. When Woodrow Wilson began preparing the nation for war, Progressives in Congress reacted by enacting a special tax on munitions makers and a war excess-profits tax.

Criticism of armaments cooled in Europe with the outbreak of war in 1914, and in America when it entered the war in 1917, though a minority in America including George W. Norris continued to claim that arms makers and financiers were pushing the country into the war.

The industrialized weapons of WWI ushered in the era of industrialized warfare that efficiently killed men without any of the chivalry of ancient battle. The general public came to consider large wartime profits as compelling evidence of profiteering without considering the complexities of what constitutes a fair profit or that munitions makers are necessary during wartime. An additional aspect of moral outrage was a general feeling that producing equipment for the purpose of destroying human life was wrong, but that the farmer who grows cotton for explosives or the miner who digs ore that is forged into guns was above reproach. Rather than considering the moral dimensions of each citizen's participation, a simple stereotype developed that assigned all moral opprobrium to owners of the munitions industry, or merchants of death, as they came to be known. When DuPont emerged from the war having made a large profit on sales of explosives, they were branded as greedy profiteers despite having lowered prices during the war.

Outrage cooled following the Armistice with the League of Nations's attempts at international arms control receiving little popular support in America. However, things flared up again in 1926 with the publication of Genesis of War by controversial historian Harry Elmer Barnes who claimed Germany was blameless and that Wilson and his warmongering assistants were at fault instead.

Arms control was debated by the United States Congress in the late 1920s including the Burton Resolution of 1928 and the Capper and Porter resolutions of 1929 which proposed to prohibit exports of arms to any nation engaged in war. In August of 1929, three large American shipbuilding companies were revealed to have employed William Shearer to sabotage the Geneva Naval Conference of 1927. An investigation by the United States Senate resulted in considerable press coverage, but no concrete action. War itself was renounced with the signing of the Kellogg–Briand Pact.

== The Great Depression ==
As the world descended into the Great Depression and European nations defaulted on their debts, disenchanted Americans became certain that “someone” in big business must be responsible for the mess they found themselves in. Public fear of war built during the Depression as the Japanese invasion of Manchuria, the Second Italo-Ethiopian War, the Chaco War, and Adolf Hitler's rise to power made clear the possibility of another world war.

Congress investigated ways to “remove profits from war” with the War Policies Commission established in 1930. The commission featured Bernard Baruch as its star witness, who published Taking the Profit out of War around the same time.

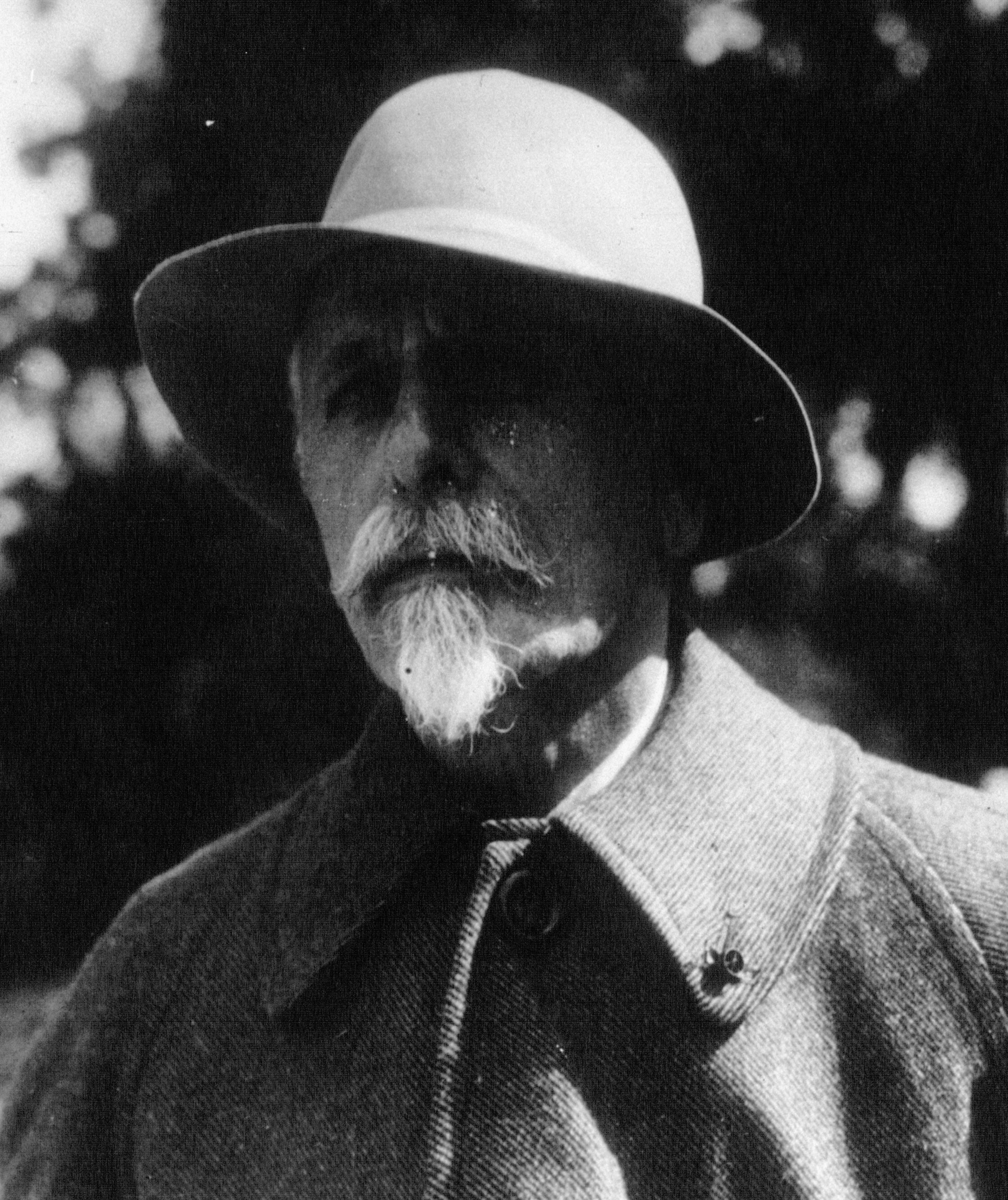
British arms dealer Basil Zaharoff

The term Merchants of Death was introduced to the public in 1932 as the title of an article in Le Crapouillot by French journalist Xavier de Hauteclocque about a British arms dealer named Basil Zaharoff, originally called in French "Sir Basil Zaharoff, le magnat de la mort subite" and translated as "Zaharoff, Merchant of Death." Hautcloque referred to Zaharoff as "marchand de mort subite," which had many idiomatic meanings in French but wasn't used to refer to arms dealers.

The American delegation to the World Disarmament Conference of 1932 enjoyed broad public support for establishing international control over arms makers. The international arms industry was then accused of sabotaging this conference first in British and French press, and then in The Literary Digest and The Nation through 1933. The most important American publications of this period were a series of three articles by Progressive historian Charles A. Beard in The New Republic that focused specifically on alleged abuses by American arms makers.

Public outrage was further stoked in 1934 by the book-length exposés Merchants of Death by H. C. Engelbrecht and F. C. Hanighen, Zaharoff, High Priest of War by Guiles Davenport, Iron, Blood and Profits by George Seldes and an article in Fortune which was popularized further by a reprinting in Reader's Digest.

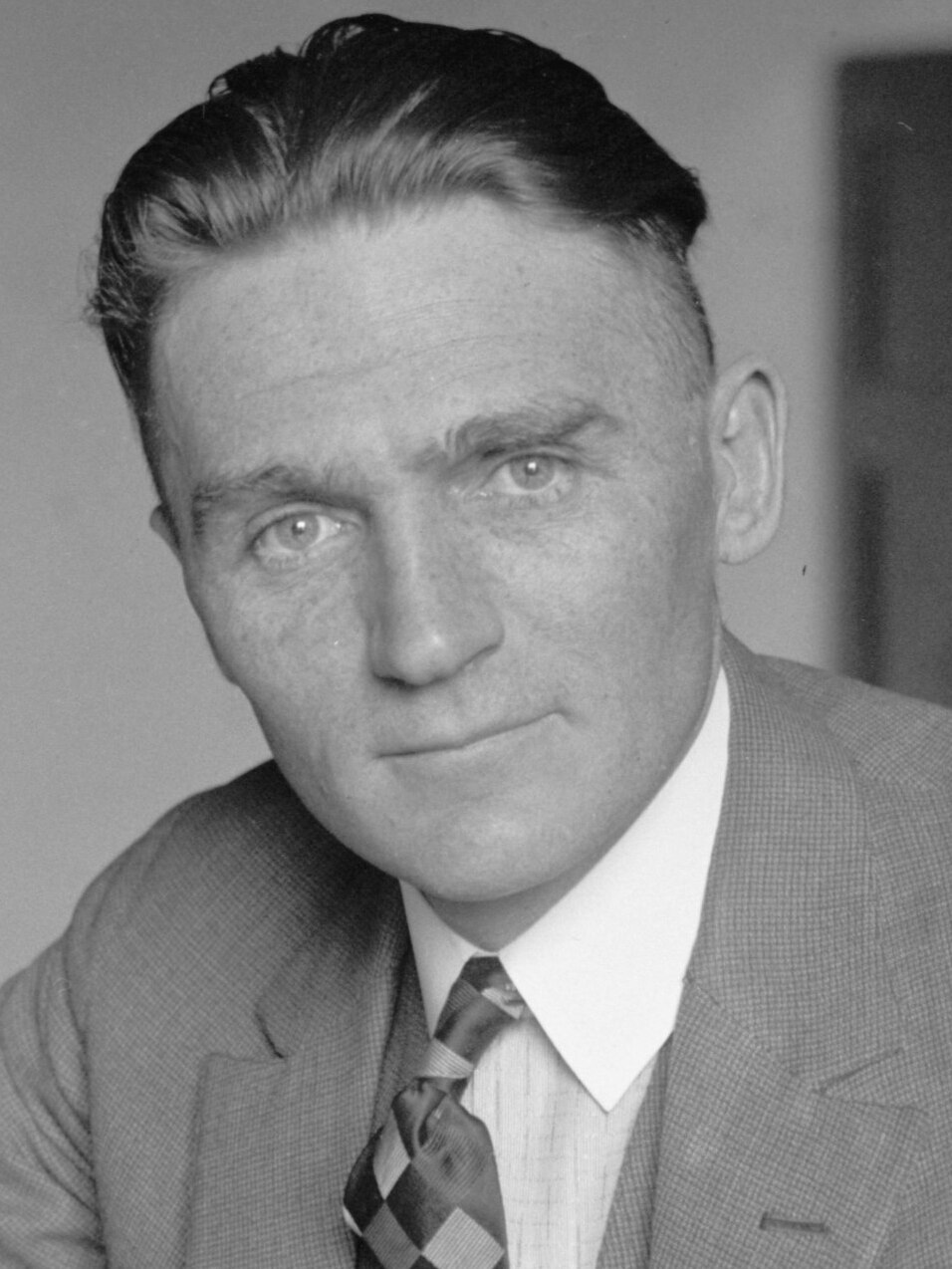
American politician Gerald Nye who rose to fame by investigating "merchants of death"

Things came to a head with formation of the Nye Committee which generated headlines for the next two years. Gerald Nye rose to fame by launching a series of congressional hearings aiming to prove the theory that munitions makers and bankers were responsible for American entry into WWI, and for war in general. Ninety-three hearings were held, over 200 witnesses were called, and little hard evidence of a conspiracy was found. The Nye Committee came to an end when Chairman Nye accused President Woodrow Wilson of withholding information from Congress when he chose to enter World War I.

The Nye Committee failed to substantiate the theory, but succeeded in convincing the public by way of sensationalist rhetoric. When the hearings were finished and a final report made, the committee members were almost unanimous in their view that the evidence failed to support the merchants of death theory. However, Nye did uncover rampant conflicts of interest and questionable practices among members of the War Industries Board. President Truman later called the Nye Committee “…pure demagoguery in the guise of a Congressional Investigating Committee.”

Similar allegations in Great Britain resulted in a government inquiry in 1935–1936.

The outrage whipped up by the Nye Committee resulted in a series of isolationist Neutrality Acts that prohibited private loans and sales of war materials whenever a state of war existed anywhere on the globe. These laws are now generally regarded as having aided the rise of Nazi Germany and were repealed in 1941.

== Influential scandals ==
=== Anglo-French naval panics ===
The Royal Navy was known to be in superb shape in 1884, but a series of editorials in the Pall Mall Gazette claimed that England was in imminent danger of invasion by a secret French navy. The rumor spread to newspapers around the country and was aided by voices of businessmen who were concerned about the high unemployment rate at the time. The panic caused the Admiralty to ask for emergency funds to reinforce its fleet, despite believing such a tax increase to be unnecessary.

=== Carnegie Steel ===
In 1894, allegations of fraud were made against the Carnegie Steel Company in connection with armor plate that it was manufacturing for the government. The company’s president, Charles M. Schwab, was called to testify before Congress. However, despite the bluster of some congressmen who pushed for a federal armor factory, the furor passed after it became clear that the government gained more from the relationship than it lost. The incident brought to light the problem of a revolving door where naval officers on temporary leave worked for these steel companies and even received royalties on patents.

=== Anglo-German Naval Race of 1909 ===
British naval officers and industrialists agreed to interpret German naval expansion as a threat to British security in order to secure dramatically increased naval spending from the British people. This collusion fueled the arms race.

The arms race was fomented by H.H. Mulliner, director of the Coventry Ordnance Works who wished to increase his firm’s government orders. He went about this by sharing what he claimed was secret intelligence that the Germans were about to overtake England in shipbuilding. Krupp, a German firm with a fearsome reputation, was implicated in this false rumor. After attempting to directly influence the Admiralty with his story it was leaked to the press which had the desired effect of inflaming public sentiment to the point that protesters began demanding an increase in English shipbuilding to counter the fictitious German threat. Denials by Krupp and Berlin only made matters worse. Parliament responded by allocating money for four new ships, which prompted Germany to increase its own spending.

Mulliner’s scheme was revealed three years after he started spreading the rumors when his firm received only a small share of the anticipated work, prompting him to write a series of letters to The Times explaining his role in fabricating the scare, while defending himself as having acted out of a sense of patriotism. Mulliner was fired by Coventry Ordnance Works and the firm was blocked from government contracts for 3 years.

=== Shearer affair ===
In August 1929, three large American shipbuilding companies were revealed to have employed William Shearer to sabotage the Geneva Naval Conference of 1927. An investigation by the United States Senate resulted in considerable press coverage, but no concrete action.

== See also ==
- Business Plot
- Causes of World War I
- Neutrality Acts of the 1930s
- Nye Committee
- Military-industrial complex
- War Is a Racket
