= Nye Committee =

1930s U.S. Senate committee that investigated war profiteering

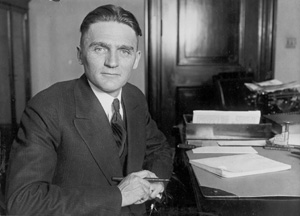
Senator Gerald Nye (R-North Dakota), head of the Senate Munitions Investigating Committee

The Nye Committee, officially known as the Special Committee on Investigation of the Munitions Industry, was a United States Senate committee (April 12, 1934 – February 24, 1936), chaired by U.S. Senator Gerald Nye (R-ND). The committee investigated the financial and banking interests that underlay the United States' involvement in World War I and the operations and profits of the industrial and commercial firms supplying munitions to the Allies and to the United States. It was a significant factor in public and political support for American neutrality during the Great Depression. The resulting Neutrality Acts are now generally regarded as having aided the rise of Nazi Germany and the laws were repealed in 1941.

== Background ==
During the 1920s and 1930s, dozens of books and articles appeared about the high cost of war, and some argued that financiers and arms manufacturers had maneuvered the United States into entering World War I. One of the best-known was Smedley D. Butler, a retired Marine Corps general who had become a spokesman for left-wing anti-war elements. Historian Charles Callan Tansill's America Goes To War (1938) exploited the Nye Committee's voluminous report of testimony and evidence to develop and confirm the heavy influence exercised by Wall Street finance (notably J.P. Morgan) and the armaments industry (notably DuPont) in the process that led to American intervention.

The push for the appointment of Senator Gerald Nye (R-ND) to the chairmanship of this committee came from Senator George Norris (R-NE). According to peace activist Dorothy Detzer, Norris said, "Nye's young, he has inexhaustible energy, and he has courage. Those are all important boons. He may be rash in his judgments at times, but it's the rashness of enthusiasm." Norris proposed Nye as "...the only one out of the 96 whom he deemed to have the competence, independence and stature for the task."

== Organization ==
The committee was established on April 12, 1934. There were seven members: Nye, the committee chair; and Senators Homer T. Bone (D-WA), James P. Pope (D-ID), Bennett Champ Clark (D-MO), Walter F. George (D-GA), W. Warren Barbour (R-NJ), and Arthur H. Vandenberg (R-MI).

Stephen Rauschenbusch, son of Christian Social Gospel activist Walter Rauschenbusch, was appointed lead counsel for the Committee; his assisting counsel included Robert Wolforth, Josephine Burns and Alger Hiss. John T. Flynn "played a major role in the course of the investigation" as a member of the committee's Advisory Council of experts. Burns and Rauschenbusch, who met on the committee, married soon after and co-authored a book that recounts salient testimony gathered by the investigation, War Madness (Washington, D.C., National Home Library Association, 1937). Alger Hiss served as a legal assistant (counsel) to the committee from July 1934 to August 1935. Most famously, Hiss "badgered" DuPont officials and questioned and cross-examined Bernard Baruch on March 29, 1935. About their testimony, Dorothy Detzer (Appointment On The Hill, p. 169) reports: "The four solemn Du Pont brothers," averred that "the corporation's profits of 400% during the First World War seemed only the good fruit of sound business."

== Process ==
The Nye Committee conducted 93 hearings and questioned more than 200 witnesses. The first hearings were in September 1934 and the final hearings in February 1936. The hearings covered four topics:

- The munitions industry
- Bidding on Government contracts in the shipbuilding industry
- War profits
- The background leading up to U.S. entry into World War I.

The committee documented the huge profits that arms factories had made during the war. It found that bankers had pressured Wilson to intervene in the war in order to protect their loans abroad. The arms industry was found to have engaged in price-fixing, and it held excessive influence on American foreign policy leading up to and during World War I.

According to the United States Senate website:

"The investigation came to an abrupt end early in 1936. The Senate cut off committee funding after Chairman Nye blundered into an attack on the late Democratic President Woodrow Wilson. Nye suggested that Wilson had withheld essential information from Congress as it considered a declaration of war. Democratic leaders, including Appropriations Committee Chairman Carter Glass of Virginia, unleashed a furious response against Nye for 'dirtdaubing the sepulcher of Woodrow Wilson.' Standing before cheering colleagues in a packed Senate Chamber, Glass slammed his fist onto his desk until blood dripped from his knuckles."

== Results ==
Nye created headlines by drawing connections between the wartime profits of the banking and munitions industries to America's involvement in the World War. This investigation of these "merchants of death" helped to bolster sentiments favoring neutrality, non-interventionism, disarmament, and taking the profits out of weapons procurement.

In its final report, the Nye Committee identified the Chaco War between Bolivia and Paraguay as a key example of complicity between debt financiers, arms makers, and militaries. The Committee described the dynamic:

When a limited amount of materiel, such as machine guns, was available, Bolivia could be forced into ordering them on the threat that unless she acted quickly, Paraguay would get them. Killing the back-country Indians of South America with airplanes, bombs, and machine guns, boiled down to an order to get busy because "these opera bouffe revolutions are usually short-lived, and we must make the most of the opportunity."

— Nye Committee report (1936)

When the hearings were finished and a final report made, the committee members were almost unanimous in their view that the evidence failed to support the merchants of death theory. However, Nye did uncover rampant conflicts of interest and questionable practices among members of the War Industries Board. Harry S. Truman later called the Nye Committee “…pure demagoguery in the guise of a Congressional Investigating Committee.”

Senator Harry S. Truman felt that the Nye Committee had blundered by trying to place blame after the fact, and that it was foundationally unbalanced by Nye's isolationism and his desire to reduce Wilson's legacy. The greatest problem, in Truman's view, was that Nye's vitriol caused a non-interventionist backlash against the arms industry, with the result that the US was far less prepared to meet the demands of World War II. Truman determined to shape his Truman Committee as a more neutral body, investigating and acting quickly to adjust military allocations during the war. His bipartisan committee communicated privately with arms industry leaders found to be padding their contracts, so that the leaders could quietly correct their wrongdoings. Truman refrained from feeding the media inflammatory and accusatory statements. As a result, the Truman Committee was widely praised for its conduct in helping the US to reduce military expenditure in the early years of American involvement in World War II.

Nye failed at his ultimate goal of nationalizing the arms industry. However, the uproar gave momentum to the non-interventionist movement and resulted in a series of isolationist Neutrality Acts that prohibited private loans and sales of war materials whenever a state of war existed anywhere on the globe. These laws are now generally regarded as having aided the rise of Nazi Germany and were repealed in 1941.

== See also ==
- Merchants of death
- Military-industrial complex
