= H. C. Engelbrecht =

American historian

Helmuth Carol Engelbrecht (January 15, 1895 – October 8, 1939) was an American writer.

== Biography ==
Engelbrecht studied at the University of Chicago before completing his doctorate on Johann Gottlieb Fichte at Columbia University in 1932.

In 1934, while an instructor at the University of Chicago, he wrote Merchants of Death, a study on the weapons industry, together with F. C. Hanighen. His book was followed by the Revolt Against War (1937), an anti-war book.

Engelbrecht died in 1939 from a heart attack while travelling by train from New York City to Washington D.C.
