= Frank Hanighen =

American journalist

Frank Cleary Hanighen (1899 – January 10, 1964) was an American journalist.

== Biography ==
Frank Hanighen graduated from Harvard College. He worked as a foreign correspondent in Europe for The New York Post and The Philadelphia Record. He then worked as a Washington, D.C. correspondent for Common Sense. He later became an editorial assistant for Dodd, Mead and Company and a columnist for The Freeman.

In 1944, he was a founding editor of Human Events, together with Felix Morley and William Henry Chamberlin.

He was involved in the America First Committee, favoring isolationism during World War II.

== Bibliography ==
- Merchants of Death (1934, together with H. C. Engelbrecht)
- The Secret War (1934)
- Santa Anna, the Napoleon of the West (1934)
- Nothing But Danger (1939, editor)
