= The Blind Goddess =

The Blind Goddess may refer to:

- The Blind Goddess (1926 film)
- The Blind Goddess (1948 film)
- The Blind Goddess (play)
