= Irish League =

Irish League may refer to:

== Sport ==
- Former name of the Northern Ireland Football League, the national association football league of Northern Ireland
- Irish League representative team
- League of Ireland, the national association football league of the Republic of Ireland
- Irish Elite League, in rugby league
- Irish Baseball League

== Politics ==
- Irish National Land League, a political organization active from 1879 to 1882
- Irish League (or L'Association Irlandaise) founded by Maud Gonne in 1896
- United Irish League, a nationalist political party founded in 1898 and active until the early 1920s
- Irish Dominion League
- Irish Self-Determination League

== See also ==
- Gaelic League (Irish: Conradh na Gaeilge), a social and cultural organisation which promotes the Irish language
