= Alfred Hastings =

English cricketer and solicitor

Personal information
- Full name: Alfred Gardiner Hastings
- Born: 29 October 1847; Deal, Kent, England
- Died: 29 December 1916 (aged 69); Brook Green, Middlesex, England
- Batting: Right-handed

Domestic team information
- Years: Team
- 1869: Marylebone Cricket Club

Career statistics
| Competition | First-class |
|---|---|
| Matches | 1 |
| Runs scored | 1 |
| Batting average | 0.50 |
| 100s/50s | –/– |
| Top score | 1 |
| Catches/stumpings | –/– |
- Source: Cricinfo, 6 May 2021

Alfred Gardiner Hastings (29 October 1847 – 26 December 1916) was an English first-class cricketer and solicitor.

The son of Henry Cadogan Hastings, who was the Chief Constable of Surrey Constabulary, he was born in October 1847 at Deal, Kent. Hastings was educated at Winchester College, where he was in the cricket eleven. From Winchester he went up in 1866 to Corpus Christi College, Oxford. In 1868 he appeared twice at county-level for Shropshire while playing at club level for Hawkstone. A student of the Inner Temple, he was admitted as a solicitor in 1869. In the same year he made a single appearance in first-class cricket for the Marylebone Cricket Club (MCC) against Hampshire at Southampton. Hastings opened the batting for the MCC, being dismissed in both MCC innings by Charles Martin for scores of 0 and 1 respectively. Wisden described him as "over cautious as a bat, but remarkably neat and finished in style. He was good at point." As a solicitor, he was said to have "somewhat seedy clients". He was struck off in 1887 for alleged corrupt practices, having been unable to account satisfactorily for large sums of money committed to his trust by the politician William Evelyn. Hastings also had severe financial difficulties and he and his family were repeatedly bankrupt, necessitating his wife, Kate Comyns Carr (who was a painter and the sister of J. Comyns Carr) to take their two sons to continental Europe until there was enough money for the family to return to London. He eventually sent a message to Kate saying his financial position had improved, however this was not the case, and upon their return the family moved between cheap hotels. His youngest son was Patrick Gardiner Hastings, a prominent barrister. Hastings died at Hammersmith on Boxing Day in 1916.
