= Scotch Mist (play) =

1926 comedy play by Patrick Hastings

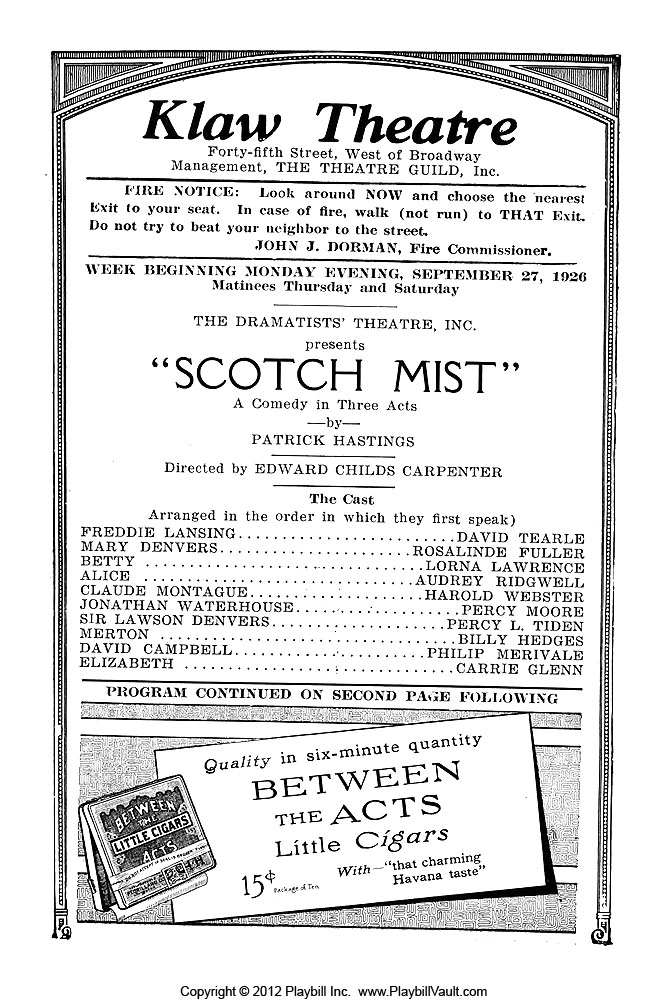
- Broadway programme
- Original language: English
- Written by: Patrick Hastings
- Genre: Comedy

Premiere
- Date: 26 January 1926
- Place: St Martin's Theatre, London

Scotch Mist is a 1926 comedy play by the British writer and barrister Patrick Hastings. Star Tallulah Bankhead played the centre of a love triangle and was apparently responsible for the play's commercial success despite critical reviews.

It ran for a 117 performances at the St Martin's Theatre in London's West End between 26 January and 3 May 1926. The cast included Bankhead, Godfrey Tearle, Edmund Breon, Abraham Sofaer and Beatrix Lehmann. It was produced by Basil Dean. A Broadway run directed by Edward Childs Carpenter at the Klaw Theatre the same year was less successful, lasting for 16 performances.

== Bibliography ==
- Wearing, J. P. The London Stage 1920-1929: A Calendar of Productions, Performers, and Personnel. Rowman & Littlefield, 2014.
