= The Moving Finger (play) =

- Original language: English
- Written by: Patrick Hastings
- Genre: Mystery

Premiere
- Date: 28 August 1928
- Place: Garrick Theatre, London

The Moving Finger is a 1928 play by the British writer and barrister Patrick Hastings. It is a murder mystery.

It ran in the West End for 30 performances at the Garrick Theatre. The cast included Sebastian Shaw, George Curzon, Ernest Milton and Lilian Braithwaite. It was produced by Basil Dean.

== Bibliography ==
- Wearing, J. P. The London Stage 1920–1929: A Calendar of Productions, Performers, and Personnel. Rowman & Littlefield, 2014.
