= Case of the Hooded Man =

1912 murder in England

R v Williams (John)
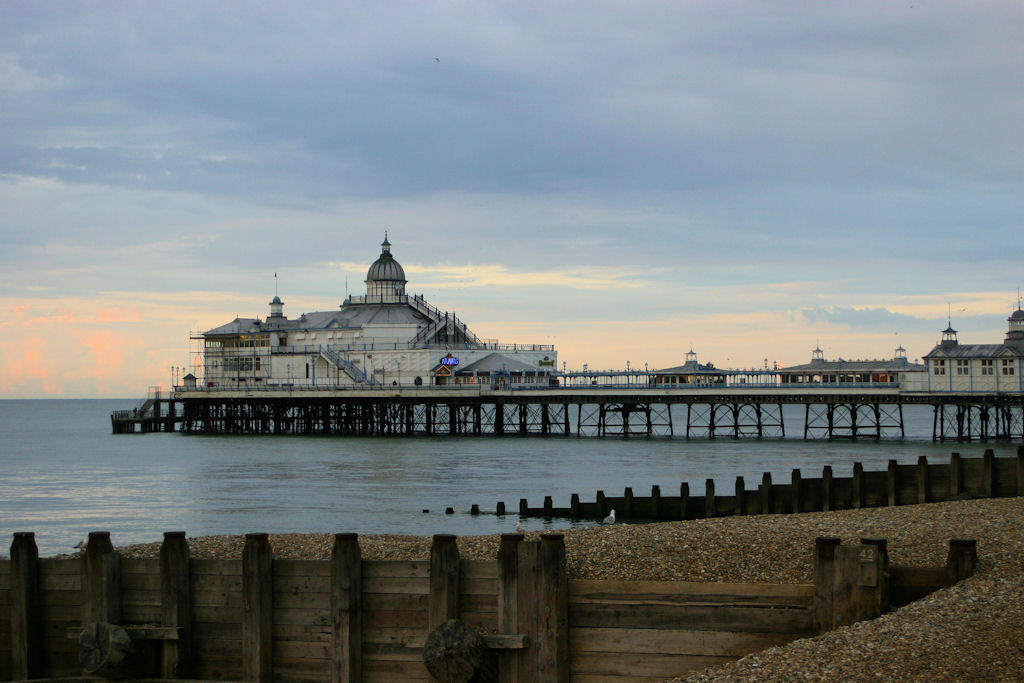
- Court: Court of Criminal Appeal
- Decided: 13 January 1913
- Citation: (1913) 8 Cr App R 133

Court membership
- Judges sitting: Lord Alverstone CJ, Ridley J and Phillimore J

Keywords
- Murder

R v Williams (1913) 8 Cr App R 133 (known as the Case of the Hooded Man and the Eastbourne Murder) was a 1912 murder in England that took its name from the hood the defendant, John Williams, wore when travelling to and from court. After the murder of a police inspector in Eastbourne, with no witnesses and little forensic evidence, Edgar Power, a former medical student, told the police that his friend John Williams had committed the murder. Power helped the police conduct a sting operation to catch Williams; police also interrogated Williams's girlfriend Florence Seymour, who then confessed to having helped Williams hide the murder weapon.

However, Seymour later recanted her story, and another man came forth claiming to know the identity of the real killer. This new evidence, along with the behaviour of the judge in both the initial case and the appeal, made the case controversial enough that Members of Parliament from the three major political parties directly questioned the Home Secretary on the matter. Despite many requests for clemency, all appeals were denied, and Williams was executed in 1913. The case was one of the first investigations in Britain to use the emerging science of ballistics.

== Background ==
On 9 October 1912, the driver of a horse-drawn carriage noticed a man crouching near the front door of the house of Countess Flora Sztaray, located on South Cliff Avenue in Eastbourne. Sztaray was known to possess large amounts of valuable jewellery and to be married to a rich Hungarian nobleman. The driver, who was Sztaray's coachman, informed Sztaray of the man's presence, whereupon Sztaray telephoned the police. Inspector Arthur Walls was sent to investigate. When Walls arrived on the scene, he observed a man lying on the portico above the front door. Walls called out, "Now then, my man, you just come down." The man fired two shots, the first of which struck and killed Walls.

The police had only two clues: some footprints in the garden, and a hat that they found in a nearby gutter. The police took moulds of the footprints and endeavoured to trace the hat, but with no success. However, during routine questioning of local residents, police learned that earlier in the afternoon of the murder, a man had been seen sitting with a heavily-pregnant young woman on a bench at one end of South Cliff Avenue; the man had also been seen wandering the street while the young woman sat on the bench alone, leading police to suspect that the man was assessing the lay of the land.

The following day, a former medical student named Edgar Power visited the police, claiming that he knew the identity of the murderer. Power said that the murderer was one George McKay, who was living in Eastbourne under the name "John Williams" with his pregnant girlfriend, Florence Seymour. Power knew Williams through Williams's brother, who was Power's best friend. Williams's brother had received a note that morning from Williams, which he had passed on to Power. Power gave the note to the police. It read: "If you would save my life come here at once to 4 Tideswell Road. Ask for Seymour. Bring some cash with you. Very Urgent." Power told the police that the letter had been written by Williams and that Williams had tried to burgle Sztaray's house and killed Inspector Walls. According to Power, Williams met with his girlfriend, Florence Seymour, after the murder, and the two decided to bury the gun on the beach and send a letter to Williams' brother asking for money to return to London, which was then given to Power. Power's motive in coming to the police was that he was in love with Seymour.

In order to trap Williams, Power asked Williams to meet him at Moorgate Street Station the following day. Police were lying in wait and arrested both Power and Williams at the Moorgate station. Police covered Williams's head with an apron to prevent him from being photographed and thus possibly influencing witnesses. However, no one had glimpsed the murderer's face, and no one selected Williams from an identity parade. Power was immediately released.

Upon his release, Power went to Seymour and told her that the police knew what had happened and that the only way to save Williams was to dig up the gun and move it somewhere safer. Seymour and Power retrieved the gun on 15 October; several police officers were lying in wait and immediately arrested both Seymour and Power. Power was released a few hours later; Seymour was retained for questioning. Seymour was pregnant and in poor condition both physically and mentally; after a few hours of questioning, she wrote and signed a statement which incriminated Williams. In her statement, Seymour stated that Williams "had left her for half an hour near the Countess's house on the night of the murder, returning without his trilby hat, and afterwards throwing away a burglar's rope with a hook on the end of it, also with him burying a revolver on the beach he had broken in two."

Despite Seymour's statement, Williams maintained that he was innocent of the murder and the burglary, saying that "whoever did that did it to get to [Sztaray's] papers for political purposes. No doubt she is mixed up in some foreign political business. I would not commit a crime like that."

Williams appeared at the magistrates' court in Eastbourne for an initial hearing. He was not represented by either a solicitor or a barrister, and pleaded not guilty. On his way to and from the court Williams's head was again covered with an apron to prevent him from being photographed; the press accordingly dubbed him "the hooded man." The police decided that Seymour should take the witness stand as soon as possible to avoid her going back on what she had told the police. As such she was called to the witness box by Cecil Whiteley (who was Treasury Counsel at the time) to go through her statement line by line. She was physically exhausted and fainted four times in the witness box; this and other interruptions meant that the initial hearing took four days. Eventually the case was referred to the Assizes for trial.

== Trial ==
The trial of John Williams for the murder of Inspector Arthur Walls began on 12 December 1912 at the Lewes Assizes, with Arthur Channell sitting as a judge. By this time, Williams had found a solicitor who had arranged for Patrick Hastings and C. F. Baker to represent him in court. The Crown was represented by Sir Frederick Low and Cecil Whiteley. The trial proved a popular one, with crowds of people outside the court house trying to see the defendants or barristers involved. A local newspaper described it as "the most sensational murder trial ... within living history."

Florence Seymour was the first person called to the witness box. She said that her statement was false, and that she had only made it because Edgar Power had told her that she would be charged with murder if she did not. This immediately disrupted the case for the prosecution; Frederick Low had made it clear in his opening statement that their case rested primarily on Seymour's testimony. Low received permission from the judge to treat Seymour as a hostile witness; despite this, she refused to say anything that would incriminate Williams. Hastings did not cross-examine her, only asking if what she had said in court was true; she said that it was and then burst into tears.

After calling a number of minor witnesses (including the cab driver and the owner of the building Williams and Seymour lived in), the prosecution called Edgar Power. Power testified that Williams had bragged about shooting Walls in response to Powers' chaffing him about being a poor shot. According to Power, Williams responded to the chaff by saying, "Well, that was a good shot anyhow," referring to the shot that had killed Walls. Williams' barrister Hastings later described Power as "[the most] utterly contemptible human being I have ever met," and during his cross-examination Hastings highlighted Power's betrayal of his close friends, Williams and Seymour.

The defendant, John Williams, was called next. Williams claimed that the package containing the rope and the gun had been given to him by a fellow thief called "Freddy Mike", who had asked him to keep the package until Mike came to collect it. After the murder, Williams was scared that he would be suspected, since he had a gun and had been arrested previously for burglary.

Following the testimony of Seymour, Power, and Williams, it became clear the jury could not convict Williams based on witness testimony alone. There was, however, some circumstantial evidence: an empty holster found by the police among Williams' possessions showed evidence of a revolver recently being inside it. The police enlisted the aid of an expert in the new science of forensic ballistics, Robert Churchill; it was one of the first times the police made use of ballistics in a case.

Churchill was able to prove, by firing a different gun of the same design, that the bullet that killed the police officer had been fired from a revolver of the same make and calibre as the gun reported to be Williams'. However, the prosecution needed proof that the bullet had been fired from that particular revolver. At the suggestion of Chief Inspector Bower, photographers attempted to photograph the inside of the gun barrel in order to prove that the bullet had been fired from that particular revolver; the attempts were unsuccessful, and Churchill instead made a cast of the inside of the gun from dental wax. The method has been called "far from satisfactory," but it was sufficient to convict Williams.

In his summing up, Judge Channell commented that the acts of the defendant in hiding the gun and fleeing Eastbourne "were acts which a guilty man would be very likely to do." He also told the jury that, while there was no direct evidence linking Williams to the murder, many cases had resulted in a conviction with even less evidence. After around fifteen minutes of deliberations, the jury returned a verdict of guilty, and Channell sentenced Williams to death.

== Court of Criminal Appeal ==
Immediately after the verdict was read, Williams' solicitor announced that he would appeal the verdict. He asked Hastings again to represent the defendant, this time in the Court of Criminal Appeal. The court met on 13 January 1913, and consisted of Lord Alverstone, Mr Justice Phillimore and Mr Justice Ridley. Hastings argued that Mr Justice Channell had misdirected the jury in the initial case, and that therefore their decision was void. Alverstone dismissed the appeal without hearing the other side of the argument, saying that he could find no evidence of misdirection. Hastings felt that Alverstone had been biased from the start, later writing that "from the outset of the hearing it was apparent that he was satisfied with the prisoner's guilt, and no legal argument seemed to make the least impression on him."

== Further appeals and execution ==
Shortly after the appeal was dismissed, Williams received a letter from "Freddy Mike", who stated that not only did he know the real murderer, but that the murderer was his twin brother who had killed the police inspector before fleeing to France. Williams immediately showed the letter to his solicitor, who contacted Scotland Yard. Accompanied by Chief Inspector Bower, Williams' solicitor visited Freddy Mike, who again told the same story. A copy of the letter was sent to the Home Secretary, Reginald McKenna, along with a statement by Florence Seymour in which she claimed that her confession had been given after threats by the police.

When Freddy Mike's statement became known to the public, various petitions and campaigns to free Williams were organised throughout the country. A petition containing 35,000 signatures requesting a reprieve was sent to the Home Secretary. As soon as the House of Commons opened on 23 January 1913, McKenna was questioned by Labour, Conservative, and Liberal MPs. Robert Munro, MP for Wick Burghs, made a speech asking the Home Secretary to take into account the conflicting accounts, lack of any direct evidence, and the way the judge had directed the jury, and pardon Williams. In this he was supported by Will Crooks, the Marquess of Tullibardine, and Ian Macpherson.

McKenna replied that:

"The house will understand that there is no part of the Home Secretary's duty which throws greater responsibility upon him or is indeed more painful, then that which has to be exercised in connection with the prerogative of mercy. Of course, any man would be only too glad to find a scintilla of evidence or reason, or I might say to invent a reason, which would enable him to save a human life. But my duty, as I understand it, is to act in accordance with the law and the traditions of my office.

I have investigated [the story of Freddy Mike] to its very foundation. I have traced the family history of the man who calls himself Freddy Mike, and I find beyond question, and I may say even on his own admission, that there is not a shred or shadow of foundation for his story from beginning to end. He said that he had a twin brother. He had no twin brother. He said that the twin brother or a friend of the twin brother was in Eastbourne that night. There were no such people, and the whole story is an invention because, having known John Williams in the past, he did not like to think of his being hanged."

McKenna concluded by saying that the law must take its course, and refused to grant a pardon.

Williams applied to Home Secretary McKenna for permission to marry Florence Seymour; McKenna denied Williams's request, and did so again when Williams petitioned a second time. Williams was executed on 30 January 1913.

== Bibliography ==
- "Executed 1913". Liverpool Mercury. 1 February 1913.
- Hyde, H Montgomery (1960). Sir Patrick Hastings, his life and cases. London: Heinemann. OCLC 498180.
- Hastings, Patrick, 'Cases in Court', Heinemann, London, 1949, pp. 292–304.
- Hastings, Patrick (1950). Autobiography (4th ed.). London: Heinemann. OCLC 2502765.
- Skinner, Keith; Martin Fido; Alan Moss. "The Development of Ballistics".
- Wilson, Colin; Damon Wilson (2003). Written in Blood: A History of Forensic Detection. Carroll & Graf Publishers. ISBN 0-7867-1266-X.
- Whiteley, Cecil (1942). Brief Life. London: Macmillan & Co. OCLC 2232402.
