= R v Secretary of State for Home Affairs, ex p O'Brien =

1923 test case in English law

R v Secretary of State for Home Affairs ex parte O'Brien [1923] 2 KB 361 was a 1923 test case in English law that sought to have the internment and deportation of Irish nationalist sympathisers earlier that year declared legally invalid. In March 1923 between 80 and 100 suspected Irish nationalists in Britain were arrested by the police and sent to the Irish Free State under the Restoration of Order in Ireland Act 1920 (ROIA). One of the detainees, Art O'Brien, challenged his detention in a test case at a divisional court. The case eventually went to both the Court of Appeal and House of Lords, who decided that the internments were illegal because the Irish Free State was an independent nation and so British acts of Parliament no longer applied to it.

The decision effectively illegalised the ROIA and led to the immediate release of O'Brien and the other detained individuals, who sued the British Government for false imprisonment. The government pushed through the Restoration of Order in Ireland (Indemnity) Act 1923, which limited the money they had to pay the detainees, who eventually received £43,000. O'Brien himself was re-arrested and found guilty of sedition, and was imprisoned until 1924.

== Background ==
The 1921 Anglo-Irish Treaty engendered an Irish Free State recognised internationally as a British dominion covering most of the island of Ireland. A 1922–23 civil war saw the Free State's National Army defeat the Irish Republican Army (IRA), which opposed the Treaty and supported the unrecognised Irish Republic. The Republic had supporters in the United Kingdom, working openly as the Irish Self-Determination League (ISDL), and the Free State government shared the names of these supporters with the British authorities, who kept a close eye on them. In February and March 1923 they provided information on individuals that they said were part of widespread plots against the Free State being prepared on British soil. On 11 March the police in Britain arrested IRA sympathisers living there, including Art O'Brien, the head of the ISDL. Sources disagree on numbers, giving either approximately eighty or approximately 100. The arrested men were placed on special trains and sent to Liverpool, where they were transferred to Dublin via a Royal Navy destroyer. It later transpired that not only were many British citizens (Art O'Brien himself had been born in England), at least six had never even been to Ireland before.

The next day the arrests were publicly queried in the House of Commons, and a Labour backbencher Jack Jones started a debate on the subject in the afternoon. W.C. Bridgeman, the Home Secretary, said that he had directly ordered the police to arrest the ISDL members under the Restoration of Order in Ireland Act 1920, and that he had consulted the Attorney General who considered it legal.

== Divisional court ==
A few days after the arrests the solicitors for one of the deported men, Art O'Brien, got in contact with Sir Patrick Hastings KC, a Member of Parliament for the Labour Party and a noted barrister. On 23 March 1923 Hastings represented O'Brien in front of a divisional court consisting of Mr Justice Avory and Mr Justice Salter to apply for a writ of habeas corpus for O'Brien as a test case to allow the release of the others. The initial hearing did not go anywhere because Hastings was unable to provide an affidavit from O'Brien (who was in Mountjoy Prison), which was required for a writ of habeas corpus to be considered, but by the time the hearing was resumed on 10 April he had managed to obtain one. Hastings argued that because the Irish Free State was an independent nation the British laws governing it, such as the 1920 act, were effectively repealed. In addition the Home Secretary had no power to order an individual to be detained overseas because he had no control over what happened to them there.

The court eventually declared that they could not issue a writ, because the Habeas Corpus Act 1862 prevented them from issuing a writ to any colony or dominion possessing a court which could also issue a writ. Since the Free State possessed such a court, the English divisional court could not act. Hastings attempted to argue that the writ could be issued against the Home Secretary but this also failed, since the Home Secretary did not actually possess O'Brien.

== Court of Appeal and House of Lords ==
The decision was then appealed to the Court of Appeal and argued on 23 and 24 April. The Court of Appeal reversed the divisional court's decision. The court decided that the Restoration of Order in Ireland Act 1920 had been implicitly repealed when the Irish Free State, an independent nation, came into existence. In addition it was not proper for the Home Secretary to order the detention and deportation of someone overseas, since they had no control over what happened to them. It was completely appropriate to issue a writ of habeas corpus against the Home Secretary because, even though he did not physically have O'Brien, he was considered responsible for him. The Home Secretary was accordingly ordered to produce O'Brien before the court on 16 May.

He appealed to the House of Lords, who decided (led by Lord Birkenhead) that they did not have the jurisdiction to hear the appeal, since a rule of English law specifies that once a writ of habeas corpus is issued (as it was by the Court of Appeal) no superior court can overrule it. After a further attempt to keep O'Brien in custody (simply by not letting him out of prison) he was finally released on 16 May.

== Aftermath ==
O'Brien immediately sued the British Government for false imprisonment, and to avoid any liability the government prepared the Restoration of Order in Ireland (Indemnity) Act 1923 which would indemnify them against any claims for damages by the imprisoned sympathisers. The Labour Party whittled it down when it was being prepared so that it would only limit compensation rather than remove it entirely. A tribunal was set up under Lord Atkin to assess damages, and the sympathisers as a whole were eventually paid £43,000. Art O'Brien himself was arrested soon after release and convicted of sedition. He was released in 1924.

== Bibliography ==
- Amato, Joseph Anthony (2002). Rethinking home: a case for writing local history. University of California Press. ISBN 0-520-23293-3.
- Bonner, David (2007). Executive Measures, Terrorism and National Security: Have the Rules of the Game Changed?. Ashgate Publishing. ISBN 978-0-7546-4756-0.
- Chandler, Porter R. (March 1924). "Praemunire and the Habeas Corpus Act. Considered in Connection with the Irish Deportations and the Case of Ex Parte O'Brien". Columbia Law Review. 24 (3): 273–284. doi:10.2307/1111640. JSTOR 1111640.
- Hart, Peter (2003). The I.R.A. at war, 1916–1923. Oxford University Press. ISBN 0-19-925258-0.
- Hyde, H Montgomery (1960). Sir Patrick Hastings, his life and cases. London: Heinemann. OCLC 498180.
