= Escort (play) =

- Written by: Patrick Hastings
- Original language: English
- Genre: War

Premiere
- Date premiered: 18 August 1942
- Place premiered: Lyric Theatre, London

Escort is a 1942 play by the British writer Patrick Hastings. It is a wartime spy thriller about sabotage on a Royal Navy ship.

It ran for 24 performances at the West End Lyric Theatre between 18 August and 5 September 1942. The cast included Thorley Walters, Michael Shepley, John Stuart and Barry Morse. It was produced by Basil Dean.

It was praised by The Spectator, which had recently panned Terence Rattigan's much more successful Flare Path, as "the best and most convincing spy play" to date.

== Bibliography ==
- Wearing, J.P. The London Stage 1940-1949: A Calendar of Productions, Performers, and Personnel. Rowman & Littlefield, 2014.
