= Habeas Corpus Act 1862 =

Act of the Parliament of the United Kingdom

Habeas Corpus Act 1862 (Note: The citation of this act by this short title was authorised by section 1 of, and the first schedule to, the Short Titles Act 1896, section 1 and the first schedule. Due to the repeal of those provisions it is now authorised by section 19(2) of the Interpretation Act 1978.)
- Act of Parliament
- Parliament of the United Kingdom
- Long title: An Act respecting the Issue of Writs of Habeas Corpus out of England into Her Majesty’s Possessions abroad.
- Citation: 25 & 26 Vict. c. 20
- Territorial extent: United Kingdom

Dates
- Royal assent: 16 May 1862
- Commencement: 16 May 1862 (Note: The Acts of Parliament (Commencement) Act 1793.)
Other legislation
Amended by	Statute Law Revision Act 1893

Status: Amended

Text of statute as originally enacted

Revised text of statute as amended

Text of the Habeas Corpus Act 1862 as in force today (including any amendments) within the United Kingdom, from legislation.gov.uk.

The Habeas Corpus Act 1862 (25 & 26 Vict. c. 20) is an act of the Parliament of the United Kingdom that limited the right of the English courts to issue writs of habeas corpus in British colonies or dominions. The act was passed in response to Ex parte Anderson, a case in the Canadian courts in which the English Court of King's Bench attempted to issue a writ of habeas corpus and have Anderson appear before an English judge. While the court issued the writ, it felt that setting such a precedent would interfere with the "higher degree of Colonial independence". As a result, the act was passed, receiving royal assent on 16 May 1862.

The act consists of only two clauses:

- Section 1 declares that no writ of habeas corpus can be issued by an English judge to any foreign nation or colony which forms part of the Queen's possessions (broadly speaking, the Commonwealth of Nations) if that nation has a court able to issue such a writ.

No writ of habeas corpus shall issue out of England, by authority of any judge or court of justice therein, into any colony or foreign dominion of the Crown where Her Majesty has a lawfully established court or courts of justice having authority to grant and issue the said writ, and to ensure the due execution thereof throughout such colony or dominion.

- Section 2 states that the act does not affect the rights of citizens of those nations to appeal cases to the Judicial Committee of the Privy Council.

The act was notably used in R v Secretary of State for Home Affairs, ex p O'Brien [1923] 2 KB 361, in which Sir Patrick Hastings' challenge to the deportation and internment of British citizens to the Irish Free State was rebuffed by the divisional court because the 1862 act meant that the court had no jurisdiction to order the release of the citizens.

In 1971 Lord Denning led the Court of Appeal in Re Keenan [1971] 3 WLR 844 in saying that no English court has jurisdiction to issue a writ of habeas corpus anywhere in Ireland, whether in Northern Ireland or the Republic of Ireland. He based this judgment partially on the 1862 act, and partially on a judgment of Lord Mansfield construing the Repeal of Act for Securing Dependence of Ireland Act 1782 (22 Geo. 3. c. 53) and the Irish Appeals Act 1783 (23 Geo. 3. c. 28) in declining the opportunity to issue a writ in Northern Ireland.

== Bibliography ==
- Lauterpacht, Elihu (1989). International Law Reports. Cambridge University Press. ISBN 0-949009-38-5.
- Osborn, P. G. (2008). A Concise Law Dictionary - For Students and Practitioners. Read Books. ISBN 978-1-4437-2948-2.
- Hyde, H Montgomery (1960). Sir Patrick Hastings, his life and cases. London: Heinemann. OCLC 498180.
- Yale, D. E. C. (1972). "Habeas Corpus. Ireland. Jurisdiction". Cambridge Law Journal. 30 (1). Cambridge University Press: 4–7. doi:10.1017/S0008197300008503.
