= Extradition case of John Anderson =

19th-century Canadian legal case

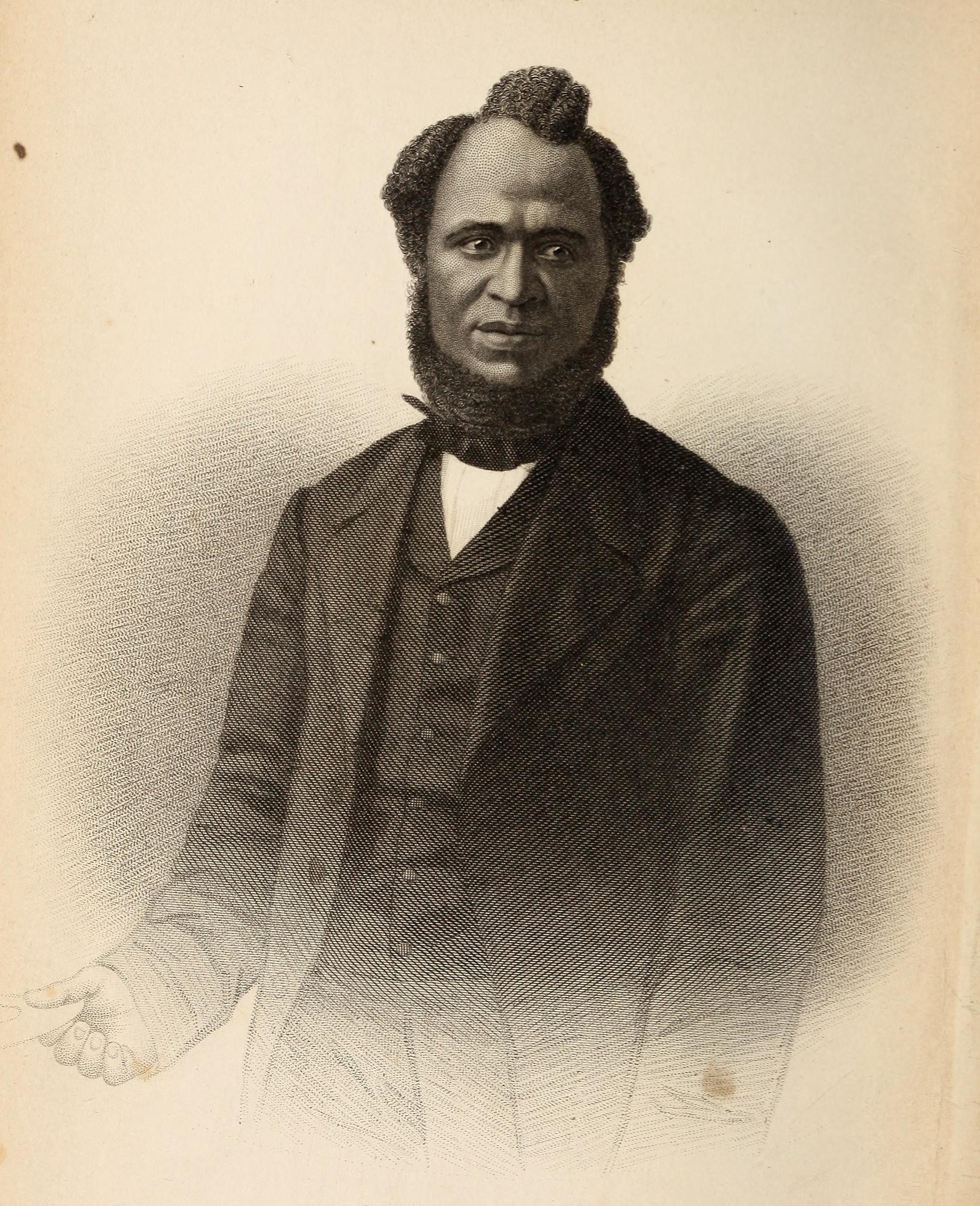
Engraving from The Story of the Life of John Anderson (1863)

The Anderson case took place in Canada West from 1860 to 1861. The case dealt with whether or not to extradite an escaped slave to the United States on the charge of murder. The majority of the presiding judges who handled the case agreed that there was sufficient evidence to prove criminality of the extraditable offence. The decision was based upon the terms laid out in Article X of the Webster–Ashburton Treaty of 1842. Anderson was released on appeal.

== Background ==
Jack Burrows, an enslaved man in Missouri, escaped from slavery in September 1853. On 28 September, three days after he left his enslavers, he encountered Seneca T. P. Digges, a slaveowner who sent his slaves to recapture Burrows. During a struggle, Burrows stabbed Digges, who died on 11 October. Accounts differ on whether Digges provoked Burrows.

Burrows, tracked by bounty hunters, travelled by foot to Chicago. From there, he went to Detroit and entered Canada, reaching Windsor (then in Canada West) in November 1853. While in Canada, Burrows changed his name to John Anderson. Anderson lived and worked in Canada West from 1854 to April 1860, managing to keep a low profile.

A slave catcher from Detroit named James H. Gunning investigated Anderson's case and eventually got a warrant around April or May 1860. Anderson was arrested in August and held by Magistrate William Matthews in Brantford.

Article X of the Webster–Ashburton Treaty allowed extradition from British North America to the United States if the act for which the US sought extradition would constitute a crime in the relevant British jurisdiction (in this case, Canada West). The central issue in Anderson's extradition case was whether his stabbing of Digges was a crime or simply an incident of his escape from slavery.

On 15 December 1860, in a 2–1 decision, the Court of Queen's Bench ruled Anderson could be charged with murder if the alleged crime had happened in Ontario and thus, based upon a literal interpretation of the treaty, he should be extradited. The decision was reversed on appeal by the Court of Common Pleas in Toronto when the judges ruled the crime Anderson was alleged to have committed was manslaughter, not murder, and thus not a crime to which the Webster-Ashburn Treaty applied. In addition, the court noted that Anderson had not been formally charged for murder by a court in Missouri, and thus the Brantford court had no jurisdiction to consider the case. Anderson was released and eventually immigrated to Liberia.

At the same time, abolitionists in Canada and the United Kingdom appealed the Brantford decision to the British Court of Queen's Bench at Westminster, which ordered Anderson released on 14 January 1861. The British ruling came after the Toronto court's decision, but was still viewed as a setback to efforts to ensure the independence of the Canadian judiciary system.

== Legal and political significance ==
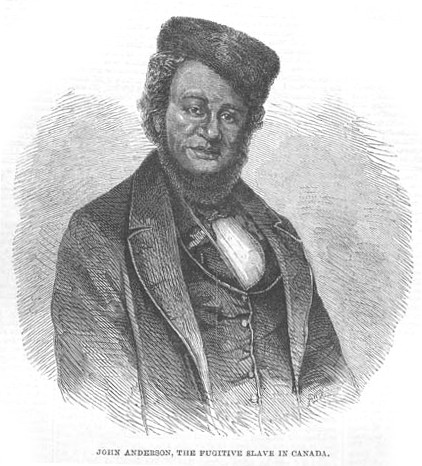
From the Illustrated London News, 1861

Some have argued that the Anderson case, aside from igniting a media, legal, and political frenzy, had a profound impact on Canada's future relationship with Britain. It also set an important precedent for Canadian leaders to make the superior courts handle the most political divisive decisions, which had originally been reserved for the executive branch of government.

== Assistance ==
Anti-slavery associations from Britain and pre-Confederation Canada played an instrumental role in assisting Anderson before, during, and after the case. John A. Macdonald used public funds to foot the bill for Anderson's legal defences.

== Britain attempts to intervene ==
A notable event occurred while Anderson was awaiting an appeal of the Canadian court's initial decision, which stipulated that he should indeed be extradited. The English Court of Queen's Bench attempted to interfere by sending a writ of habeas corpus for him to appear before a court in London, England. To Britain's Canadian subjects, who were already in the process of handling the situation, "Not only was the writ 'an evil precedent', but it could lead to further conflict between English and Canadian judicatures." The English courts never got their chance to handle the case because Anderson's appeal was expedited to the Court of Common Pleas. He was released because of faulty wording in the warrant.

== Reactions ==
The issue with the British writ and the negative reaction to it uncovered the need for written clarification of the relationship between British and Canadian courts. As one result, the Habeas Corpus Act 1862 was passed by the Parliament of the United Kingdom in 1862, which denied British courts the right to issue writs of habeas corpus for British colonies or dominions with their own courts capable of doing so. It reaffirmed that Canadian jurisdictions had become self-sufficient and did not take kindly to interference in their judicial system.

== Works cited ==
- Brode, Patrick (1989). The Odyssey of John Anderson. University of Toronto Press; Osgoode Society for Canadian Legal History. ISBN 978-1-4426-8192-7. OCLC 244766532.
- Farewell, J. E. (1912). "The Anderson Case". Canadian Law Times. 32. Carswell: 256–262.
- Finkelman, Paul (1995). "The Anderson Case and Rights in Canada and England". In Knafla, Louis A.; Binnie, Susan W. S. (eds.). Law, Society, and the State: Essays in Modern Legal History. University of Toronto Press. pp. 37–72. ISBN 0-8020-0535-7. OCLC 33282630.
- Reinders, Robert C. (December 1975). "The John Anderson Case, 1860–1: A Study in Anglo‐Canadian Imperial Relations". Canadian Historical Review. 56 (4): 393–415. doi:10.3138/CHR-056-04-01. ISSN 0008-3755. Project MUSE 570119.
- Johnson, J. K.; Stelmack, Carole B., eds. (1969). The Letters of Sir John A. Macdonald. Vol. 2. Ottawa: Public Archives of Canada. OCLC 23294559.
