= Art O'Brien (Irish republican) =

Irish Republican activist

Arthur (Art) O'Brien (O Briain) (25 September 1872 - 12 August 1949) was an Irish republican activist during the Irish War of Independence and an important mediator during the negotiations leading up to the Anglo-Irish Treaty. He was a longtime leader of a large Irish language movement, a gun runner and also served as a diplomat during the early years of the Irish Free State.

== Background ==
Art O'Brien was born in London - the son of a British Army Officer. O'Brien's father was born in Cork City, Ireland and died when Art was five years of age. His mother was from a middle-class English family that owned a successful publishing company. Art and his mother lived in the affluent London suburb of Kensington and traveled back to Cork on a regular basis. On his visits to Cork O'Brien was exposed to the Irish language, leading him to join and eventually become a leader of the London branch of the Irish language and cultural organization the Gaelic League.

As a young man Art O'Brien studied electrical and civil engineering at St Charles' College and later at Faraday House Engineering College, London. O'Brien also studied civil engineering in Paris. O'Brien joined the Institute of Electrical Engineers in 1897, worked at several locations in England and used his natural talent with languages as he worked on engineering projects in Spain and France. His fluency in several languages also helped him later in life when he served in several diplomatic positions.

== Gaelic League ==
Art O'Brien returned to London from his engineering work overseas in 1910 and by 1911 was elected as vice president of the Gaelic League of London (GLL) and manager of its newspaper An tEireannach (The Irishman). In 1914 O'Brien was named president of the GLL holding that position for over 20 years. The GLL has been described as "a purely cultural organisation, with no pretence whatsoever to the application of physical force" but it was during this time that O'Brien met and became friends with many Irish republican leaders including Patrick Pearse, Arthur Griffith and Michael Collins. While working at engineering projects throughout England, O'Brien helped set up branches of the Gaelic League in multiple British cities.

== Irish Republicanism ==
In 1912 O'Neil joined the Irish republican political party Sinn Féin, in 1914 he joined the Irish Volunteers and in 1916 the Irish Republican Brotherhood (IRB). After the Declaration of Independence by Dáil Éireann in 1919, O'Brien served as the chief representative of the Dáil in the British capital of London during the critical years of 1919–22. Known as an extremely efficient organiser, after the 1916 Easter Rising O'Brien ran an extensive support system which aided Irish prisoners/internees in England. During the Irish War of Independence O'Brien gathered intelligence for the Irish Republican leader Michael Collins and continued to procure and ship weapons and money to Irish Republican forces in Ireland.

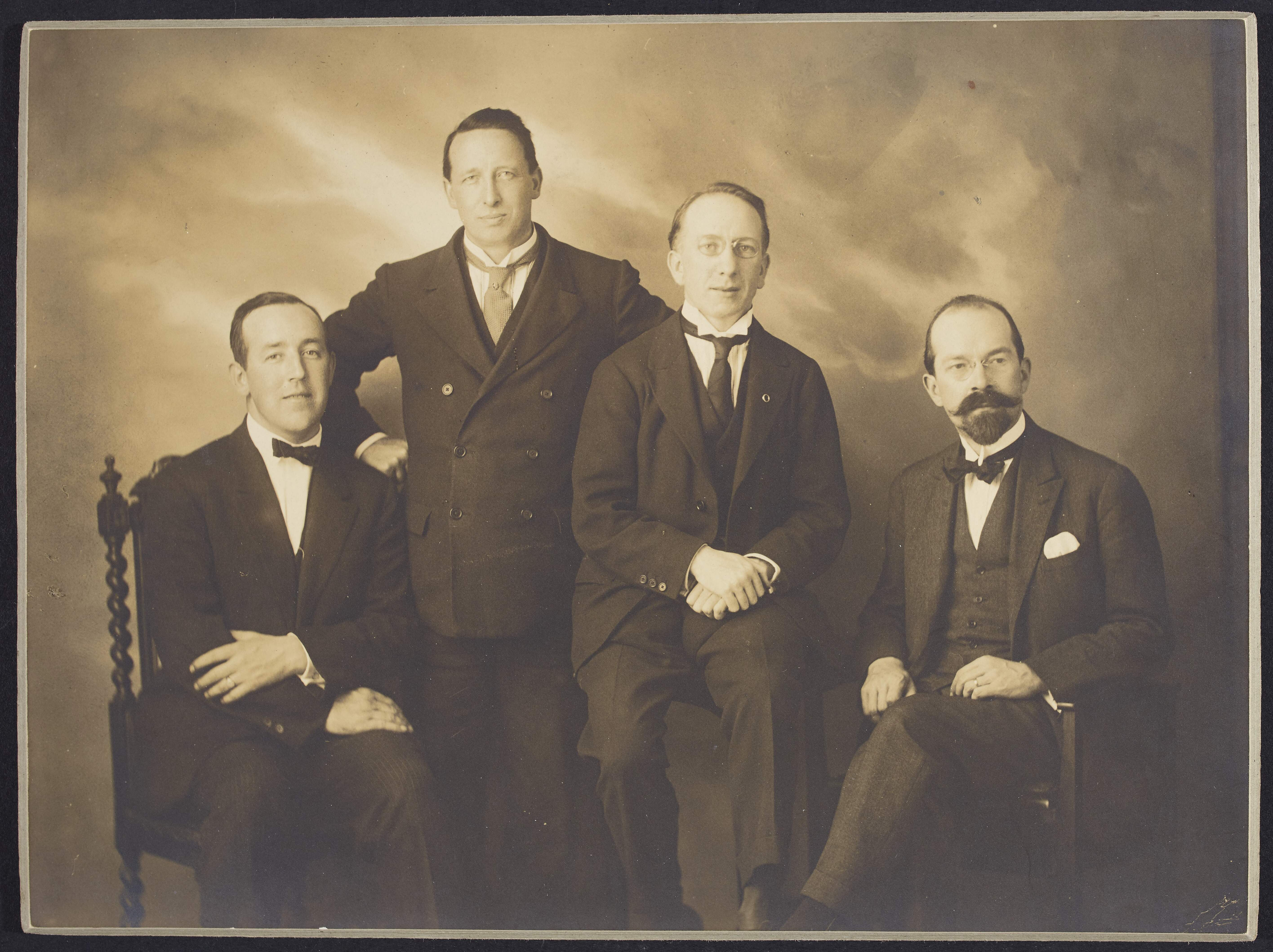
Irish nationalists Harry Boland, Arthur Patrick Donovan O'Brien, Seán T. O'Kelly and George Gavan Duffy, circa 1919

=== Gun Running ===
While in Britain, O'Brien (almost single-handedly) managed the finances for gun running operations during the 1919-1921 Irish War of Independence. His assistants Sam Maguire and Sean McGrath used the funds raised by O'Brien to purchase and ship weapons to the Volunteers back in Ireland. By 1920 O'Briens activities were being followed closely by the UK Home Office: "O'Brien has been financing the Sinn Féin representatives abroad as well as the persons concerned in attempting to introduce munitions from Germany to Ireland...The question of his internment is being considered." Funds for all foreign Dáil Éireann representatives were processed through O'Briens London office. O'Brien calculated that he had managed 60,000 pounds in 1921 for gun running and the expenses of the Dáil's foreign representatives. In order to avoid confiscation by British authorities all London funds were kept in O'Brien's personal bank account

=== Irish Self-Determination League ===
O'Brien was named President of the Sinn Féin Council of Great Britain (1916–23). He was also the co–founder of the Irish Self-Determination League (ISDL) of Great Britain, where he served as Vice–President (1919–22) and President (1922–4). While with the ISDL, Art O'Brien acted as editor of The League's London-based newspaper, The Irish Exile whose circulation peaked at 10,000 copies. The newspaper did not support the 1921 Anglo-Irish Treaty and ceased circulation in 1922. At its height in 1920 the ISDL had 214 branches and 27,000 members. On 11 February 1920 thousands of ISDL members attended a meeting at London's Royal Albert Hall where the Irish leaders Arthur Griffith and Eoin MacNeill spoke. During this time the ISDL held multiple protest meetings with up to 20,000 members in attendance in London and Manchester.

=== Fund raising, envoy in London and anti-treaty ===
While in London O'Brien worked to raise money through the Dáil loans which was used to partially fund the self-proclaimed Irish Republic and the many, local Irish republican charities. Art O'Brien dispersed funds to Irish prisoner relief organizations such as the Irish National Relief Fund and the Irish National Aid and Volunteer Dependants Fund which helped support the several thousand dependents of Irish prisoners. Collected funds were also used in support of Sinn Féin offices around the world.

In January 1919 the Dáil confirmed O'Brien as the "Envoy of the Irish Republic in London". Working closely with Collins and Irish republican leadership in Dublin, O'Neil was considered as the Irish leader Éamon de Valera's "man in London". As Envoy, O'Brien briefed the international press on a daily basis, delivering an Irish republican view of events taking place during the War of Independence. During the Irish War of Independence, O'Brien acted as a mediator in several peace initiatives between the British and Sinn Féin during 1920 and 1921. As the representative of the Irish Republic in London O'Brien formally introduced de Valera to the British Prime Minister Lloyd George and was present during each of their four meetings in July 1921.

Art O'Brien was a regular visitor to the official residences and offices of the British Prime Minister (Downing Street). He became a confidant of Thomas Jones the long-time Deputy Secretary to the British Cabinet. In late October 1921 O'Brien presented the Irish delegates to the Anglo-Irish Treaty negotiations to Lloyd George. O'Brien and de Valera had the most experience with Downing Street but neither he nor de Valera were actually present during the Anglo-Irish Treaty negotiations. During negotiations O'Brien was consulted on British proposals, but he later criticized de Valera for not attending the negotiations and not selecting a more unified delegation.

Within hours of its signing O'Brien voiced his opposition to the Anglo-Irish Treaty. At that time Thomas Jones made note that Lloyd George referred to O'Brien as "that swine" and commented concerning Art O'Brien: "nothing is as pitiable as a small man trying to handle big things." Two days after the Treaty signing, O'Brien wrote a front-page article in the Irish Exile in which he criticized the British threat of war if the Irish delegation refused to sign the Treaty agreement. Later in December 1921 O'Brien wrote to both de Valera and Collins expressing his opposition to the Treaty and urging them do their utmost to avoid a split within the republican movement. The Irish Civil War began several months later and was fought over the terms of the Anglo-Irish Treaty .

== Arrests, deportation, imprisonments and disbandment of the ISDL ==
With the signing of the Anglo-Irish Treaty O'Brien started to issue press bulletins that attacked the policies of the newly formed Irish Free State government while supporting the anti-treaty forces. Now in conflict with the policies of the newly formed Irish provisional government, in April 1922 O'Brien was dismissed as the Irish envoy in London.

During the Irish Civil War O'Brien was arrested in Dublin along with his longtime friend of Seán T. O'Kelly, the Irish envoy to the Paris Peace Conference and future President of Ireland (1945–1959). They were released after a short time but on 1 August O'Brien was arrested again in Dublin and imprisoned until 21 August 1922. O'Brien's London office was shut in September 1922, but de Valera asked him to increase publicity in England for the anti-treaty (republican) side. de Valera also asked O'Brien to organize and fund republican envoys in France, Italy and the US and to also coordinate a complaint to the International Red Cross concerning ill-treatment and executions of republican prisoners by the Irish Free State.

In March 1923 he was part of a large group of Irish civilians living in England who were deported to Dublin and imprisoned in Mountjoy Prison. A Court of Appeal ruled that O'Brien's deportation was illegal, and the deportees were returned to England. Upon arrival in England, he was immediately arrested. Harold Scott of the British Home Office commented on O'Brien's appearance: "a small dark-haired man with a pointed beard and bright dark eyes, looking more like a prosperous shopkeeper than a revolutionary."

O'Brien and his main assistant Sean McGrath were tried and convicted of seditious conspiracy, both received a prison sentence of two years. The presiding judge stated that O'Brien was: "The rallying point, the central figure, the presiding genius of the whole republican movement in this country - the alter ego of de Valera, the chief in Ireland." O'Neil served his time at HM Prison Wormwood Scrubs and HM Prison Brixton prisons until being released in July 1924. Upon his release O'Brien wrote to de Valera concerning his personal state of affairs:

After 18 months in jail, I find my house wrecked, my mother and sister in a poor state of health and my affairs generally in chaos. I am bothered by my creditors on every side. My own health impaired and I am sick with worry. All this is brought upon me after 35 years of service in the National cause and because I sacrificed myself, foolishly or otherwise in the interests of that cause.

With the signing of the Anglo-Irish Treaty, O'Brien admitted that there was a decrease in financial support from ISDL branches: "Our well-to-do people are either against us or too timid to be actively with us...The effect of the Treaty is to frighten them further away from us than they ever were before. Amongst other classes of people here, say the clerical or civil servant class etc., the vast majority of these have been rendered either hostile or apathetic as a result of the Treaty". Being anti-treaty from the start, O'Brien won a small victory when he was able to retain control of the ISDL and its considerable amount of money "but found themselves with no one left to lead." The Irish Civil War had thrown the ISDL into turmoil and by 1925 the ISDL was disbanded.

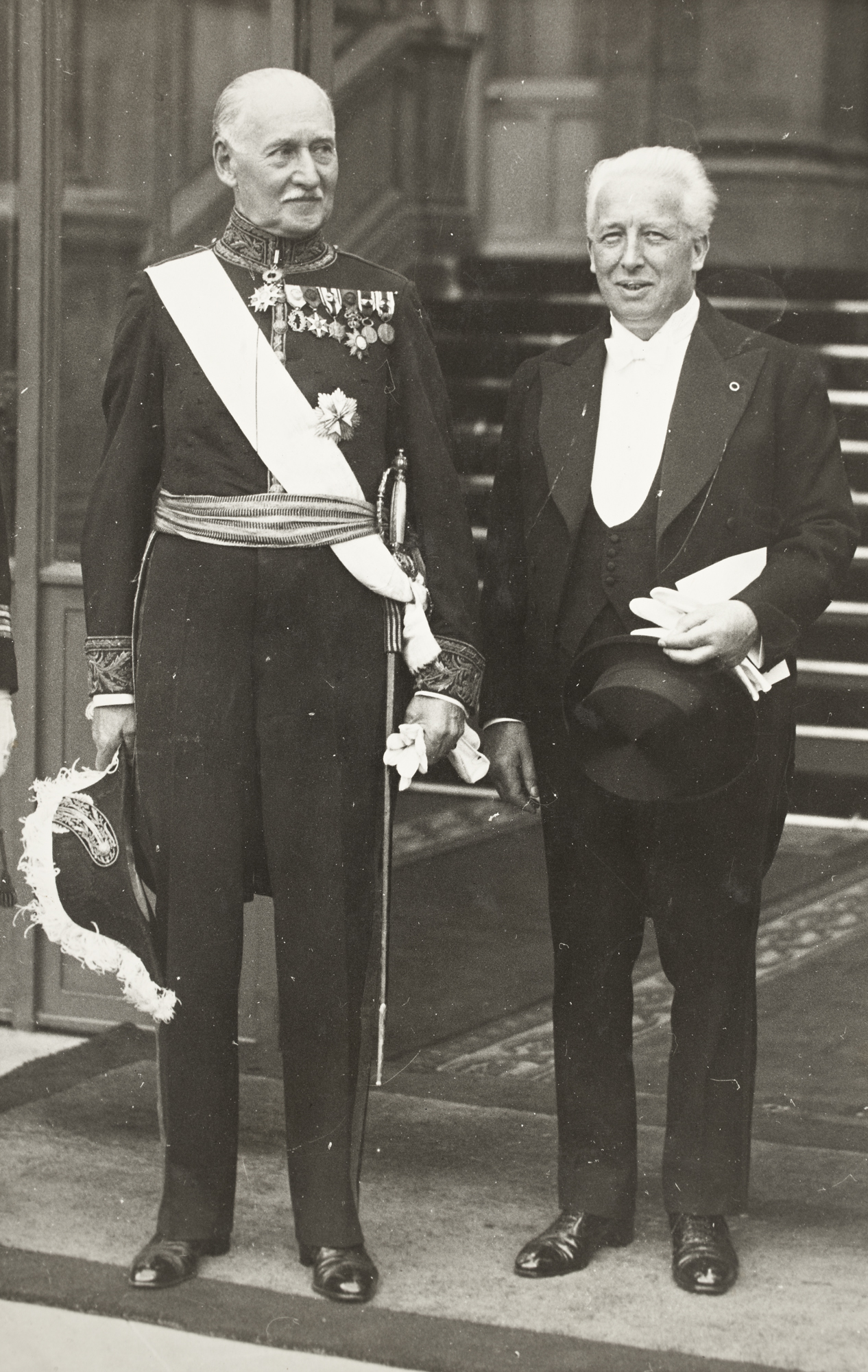
July 1935 Art O Briain, Irish Minister to France presenting his credentials at Élysée Palace to the head of French Protocol Service M. Pierre de Fouquières

== Later life and death ==
With the 1923 end of the Irish Civil War Art O'Brien turned to other work. He was the Managing Editor of The Music Trades Review (1924–35) and then served as the Irish Governments Minister to France and Belgium (1935–38). He retired from the foreign service at the mandatory retirement age. In 1938 the family publishing business in London ceased operation and in 1939 he and his sister moved to Dublin where he served as the deputy chairman, of the semi-State controlled Irish coal mining operations (Mianrai Teoranta).

Art O'Brien never married and died at the age of 76 in Dublin leaving his small estate to his sister Geraldine. Upon his death Eamon de Valera said of O'Brien "There was never a man who was more whole-heartedly or more self-sacrificingly loyal to Ireland and to the course of the Irish language and Irish independence." The sitting President of Ireland Seán T. O'Kelly attended O'Briens funeral along with the Minister of External Affairs Sean McBride and the Minister for Justice Seán Mac Eoin. Other attendees included friends from the Gaelic League and his gun running days including Sean McGrath who said of O'Brien: "Few have done more or suffered more than Art for the ideal of an Ireland not merely free but Gaelic as well, not merely Gaelic but free."

Art O'Brien is buried in an unmarked grave at Dean's Grange Cemetery, County Dublin.

== See also ==
Within the National Library of Ireland, the Art Ó Bríain (O'Brien) papers consists of 63 boxes of papers with six volumes of material.
