= The Blind Goddess (play) =

1947 play

- Original language: English
- Written by: Patrick Hastings
- Genre: Drama

Premiere
- Date: 6 October 1947
- Place: Theatre Royal, Brighton

The Blind Goddess is a 1947 play by the British barrister and writer Patrick Hastings.

It premiered at the Theatre Royal, Brighton before beginning a 133 performance West End run at the Apollo Theatre. The cast included Basil Radford, Honor Blackman, Joan Haythorne and William Mervyn.

== Film adaptation ==
In 1948 it was made into a film The Blind Goddess by Gainsborough Pictures. Directed by Harold French it stars Eric Portman, Anne Crawford and Hugh Williams.

== Bibliography ==
- Goble, Alan. The Complete Index to Literary Sources in Film. Walter de Gruyter, 1999.
- Wearing, J.P. The London Stage 1940-1949: A Calendar of Productions, Performers, and Personnel. Rowman & Littlefield, 2014.
