= The Blind Goddess (1948 film) =

1948 British film by Harold French

- British pressbook
- Directed by: Harold French
- Written by: Muriel Box; Sydney Box
- Based on: play The Blind Goddess by Patrick Hastings
- Produced by: Harold French; Betty E. Box(executive)
- Starring: Eric Portman; Anne Crawford; Michael Denison; Hugh Williams
- Cinematography: Ray Elton
- Edited by: Gordon Hales
- Music by: Bernard Grun
- Production company: Gainsborough Pictures
- Distributed by: General Film Distributors (UK)
- Release dates: 9 September 1948 (London); June 1949 (US)
- Running time: 87 minutes
- Country: United Kingdom
- Language: English
- Budget: £143,000
- Box office: £88,000 (by July 1953)

The Blind Goddess is a 1948 British courtroom drama film directed by Harold French and starring Eric Portman, Anne Crawford and Michael Denison. The screenplay concerns a secretary who sets out to expose his boss, Lord Brasted, for embezzlement. It was based on a popular 1947 play of the same title by noted barrister Patrick Hastings.

Claire Bloom made her screen debut in the film. Director Harold French said "I don't think the film was successful but it got Clare noticed."

The "blind goddess" in question is Justice.

== Plot ==
A valet shoots dead a man (later named as a Czech nobleman, one Count Mikla), steals a bundle of documents, and sets up the crime scene to look like a suicide.

Derek Waterhouse sits in an exclusive restaurant with a young woman, Mary Dearing; who is about to travel abroad to visit a sick friend. Lady Brasted, the wife of Waterhouse's employer, is also dining there. Before the couple leave, Waterhouse has a quick word with her. Outside, he chats with Mary in his car until they are moved along by a policeman.

Waterhouse is the private secretary to Lord Brasted. He tells Mary that Lord Brasted has offered him £10,000 to stay silent on a complicated deal that he, Brasted, is trying to stop the prime minister from learning about.

Lord Brasted meets with Mary's father, Sir John Dearing, a senior advocate, to allege that Waterhouse is trying to blackmail him. Later, Brasted confesses to his wife that Waterhouse's accusations are true. After Waterhouse goes to the PM, Brasted has little option other than to sue for libel. If the action is successful, Waterhouse would then face trial for blackmail.

Lady Brasted tries to lean on her former relationship with Waterhouse to convince him to change his story (as he has already told the PM, it is unclear what this would achieve). Waterhouse goes to discuss the case with Sir John Dearing but Sir John has to decline, since he has already been engaged by Lord Brasted to represent him in the upcoming case of Brasted v. Waterhouse.

The case goes to court at the Old Bailey. Waterhouse discloses that £500,000 sent to Count Mikla in Prague for post-war relief had been diverted to other persons. He believes that papers in Count Mikla's possession would prove this. Waterhouse claims that Brasted offered him a three year assignment in West Africa plus £10,000 which he interpreted as a bribe to keep silent.

Sir John, Brasted's counsel, accuses Waterhouse of trying to blackmail Brasted for a sum of £20.000.

Lady Brasted reveals to Sir John that she has a love letter from Waterhouse which would incriminate him in terms of motive. However, when Dearing goes to the Brasted house that evening, he is shown a letter quite other than the one from Waterhouse. It is said to have been concealed in the lining of Count Mikla's briefcase. The murderer from the opening scene enters the room. He is introduced as Johan Meyer and Lord Brasted says he has information on the case.

The following day, Lady Brasted comes to the Old Bailey to show Sir John the love letter. He tells her she must show it to her husband before he can introduce it as evidence.

Sir John first presents the briefcase document to the court, which appears very much to damn Waterhouse. The cross-examination turns on the phrase "it will have to go higher", which has two interpretations: a higher amount of money; or a higher authority (the PM). Sir John focuses on the first, accusing Waterhouse of trying to blackmail Brasted.

However, it is noticed in court that the letter begins "Dear Mikla"; and Waterhouse can show that "Dear Stefan" was the way he had always begun his letters to the murdered man.

Dearing is then forced to produce the love letter. It proves decisive.

Waterhouse refuses to waver in his story, which is complicated by his former love of Lady Brasted.

Brasted wins his case for libel. Both letters are sent on to the public prosecutor with a view to trying Waterhouse for blackmail. The briefcase document is printed in the newspapers. It is written on Savoy Hotel headed paper; but when Dearing and his wife dine at the Savoy later that day, the head waiter brings over a newspaper and points out that although this letter is dated March, the heading on the notepaper used was not introduced until May.

Meanwhile Mary reappears. Somehow Lady Brasted had intercepted Waterhouse's letter to Mary and passed it off as a letter to her. Mary confronts Lady Brasted. Later that evening, Sir John Dearing telephones Brasted to request a meeting for the next morning to discuss these developments.

Lord Brasted is happy to learn that Waterhouse's love letter was not to his wife. He seeks, and receives, his wife's assurance that their marriage has been a good one.

After she goes to bed, he goes out to post some letters, declining the help of his butler. Although the exact circumstance is not shown, the final scenes imply that Brasted has thrown himself under a car.

== Cast ==
- Eric Portman as Sir John Dearing KC
- Anne Crawford as Lady Helen Brasted
- Hugh Williams as Lord Arthur Brasted
- Michael Denison as Derek Waterhouse
- Nora Swinburne as Lady Dearing
- Raymond Lovell as Frank Mainwaring KC
- Claire Bloom as Mary Dearing
- Frank Cellier as The Judge at the Old Bailey
- Clive Morton as Mersel
- Elspet Gray as Daphne Dearing
- Maurice Denham as Johnson - The Butler
- Cecil Bevan as Morton
- John Stone as Sir John's Junior
- Philip Saville as Mainwaring's Junior
- Martin Benson as Count Stephan Mikla
- Cyril Chamberlain as Policeman in Park
- Thora Hird as Derek's Charwoman
- Rosemary Treston as Helen
- Martin Miller as Mario - Waiter at the Savoy
- Marcel Poncin as Bertoni
- Carl Jaffe as Johan Meyer
- Geoffrey Denton as Foreman of the Jury
- Noel Howlett as Court Usher
- Wallace Bosco as Newspaper Seller
- Philip Ray as Porter

== Production ==
Patrick Hastings was a successful lawyer who wrote plays in his spare time, of which Blind Goddess was most popular. It premiered in 1948, a few years before Hastings' death.

Film rights were purchased by Gainsborough Productions, then part of the Rank Organisation. Gainsborough head of production Sydney Box worked on the screenplay with his wife Muriel Box. It was filmed in July 1948 at Islington Studios with sets designed by the art director Norman Arnold.

It was the film debut of Claire Bloom. She had auditioned for the part of Ophelia in Hamlet and been unsuccessful, but her screen test impressed the Rank Organisation and they put her under contract.

Betty Box, who produced, requested the original script be modified so that Lady Brasted did not take a lover but only pretended to.

== Release ==
The film was released in the US in 1949. The American distributor tried to engage interest by advertising the film in the New York Law Journal.

== Reception ==
=== Critical ===
Variety said "the film is very much a carbon copy of the original play" but praised the handing and acting.

The New York Times wrote, "Justice, the poets have it, is a blind goddess...But the (film), which arrived at the Forty-second Street Embassy yesterday, illustrates that justice is not blind precisely but merely myopic and rather routine"; while TV Guide noted, "good performances help keep this rather stagy and stiff adaptation moving."

=== Box Office ===
The film was not a success at the box office.
