= Charles Martin (English cricketer) =

English cricketer

Personal information
- Full name: Charles Martin
- Born: 6 August 1836; Breamore, Hampshire, England
- Died: 28 March 1878 (aged 41); Hilsea, Hampshire, England
- Batting: Left-handed
- Bowling: Left-arm roundarm fast

Domestic team information
- Years: Team
- 1869–1870: Hampshire

Career statistics
Competition	First-class
Matches	5
Runs scored	11
Batting average	1.22
100s/50s	–/–
Top score	3
Balls bowled	476
Wickets	9
Bowling average	18.66
5 wickets in innings	–
10 wickets in match	–
Best bowling	3/38
Catches/stumpings	3/–
- Source: Cricinfo, 21 January 2010

Charles Martin (6 August 1836 – 28 March 1878) was an English first-class cricketer.

Martin was born in the New Forest in August 1936 at Breamore, Hampshire. A club cricketer for East Hants Cricket Club, Martin made his debut in first-class cricket for Hampshire against the Marylebone Cricket Club at Lord's in 1869, with him playing in the return fixture at Southampton. He made two further first-class appearances for Hampshire in 1870, both against Lancashire, in addition to playing for a Left-Handed team in the Left-Handed v Right-Handed fixture at Lord's in that same year. His four first-class matches for Hampshire saw him take 9 wickets with his left-arm roundarm fast bowling, at an average of 18.66 and with best figures of 3 for 38. In later life, Martin was a publican. He was the landlord of the Exmouth Arms public house in Southsea, and latterly was the landlord of the Coach and Horses in Hilsea. It was there that he died in March 1878.
