= Irish Self-Determination League =

The Irish Self-Determination League of Great Britain (ISDL) was established in London in 1919. In March 1919 Art O'Brien ( the future Vice President and President of the ISDL) received a letter from the Irish leader Éamon de Valera asking him to establish a new Nationalist organization composed of the Irish living in Britain. de Valera stated "It is important that meetings be held in England—in London, Manchester, Liverpool, and Newcastle on Tyne... Later, we can have meetings in Scotland, and a week or fortnight after that again, in Wales. Prolong to keep up the pressure and sustain the interest."

The constitution of the ISDL stated their objectives as the principal of self-determination for Ireland and the recognition of the Irish Republic that was proclaimed in Dublin at Easter 1916. Membership peaked at around 27,000 in and was confined to those of Irish birth or descent resident in Great Britain. In May 1920 a similar organisation led by Katherine Hughes was established in Montreal, The Irish Self-Determination League of Canada and Newfoundland.

Interest in the ISDLs public meetings was remarkable with speakers being described as “Sinn Féin celebrities” coming from the Irish nationalist's community. Starting in 1919 large scale public meetings were held in major British cities. The February 1920 meeting at London’s Albert Hall had 10,000 attendees with tens of thousands unable to attain tickets. Speakers included George Noble Plunkett, Constance Markievicz, Hanna Sheehy-Skeffington, Arthur Griffith and Eoin MacNeill.

On 11 March 1923 over 100 members and suspected members (male and female) of the League in Britain, were arrested in London, Glasgow and Liverpool in a series of dawn raids. The arrests were made during the height of the Irish Civil War at the behest of the Irish Free State. Those arrested, including both Irish and those born in Britain, were taken to either Liverpool or the Clyde where they were placed on destroyers and deported to Ireland.

The British government used legislation supposedly under the Restoration of Order in Ireland Act 1920, however the deportees subsequently sued the British government for compensation. The detentions were successfully challenged through the British courts in R v Secretary of State for Home Affairs, ex p O'Brien, ending with a House of Lords ruling that there was no legal basis for the deportation and resulting in compensation being paid to the men involved.

James Hickey, one of the deportees from Glasgow, was beaten whilst in prison in Ireland and as a result lost the hearing in his right ear. Along with all the deportees he was awarded compensation for his illegal arrest and imprisonment. On 1 October 1923 he was awarded £750 plus 100 guineas expenses. This was considerably more than the vast majority of his fellow Scottish deportees who were awarded an average of £389 plus 25 guineas. The reason cited for the difference in these sums given in the Times is that he was a businessman. He subsequently left Scotland and moved, with his family, to Dublin.

Others deported included Anthony Mullarkey of Bedlington, Northumberland. He had previously been imprisoned at Wormwood Scrubs, having been identified as Commanding Officer of the IRA in Newcastle upon Tyne. A coal miner by trade he had served with the Tyneside Irish Brigade (25th (2nd Tyneside Irish) Battalion, Northumberland Fusiliers) in World War I.

Another deportee was Art O'Brien, editor of The League's London-based newspaper, The Irish Exile whose circulation peaked at 10,000 copies. The newspaper expressed disappointment with the 1921 Anglo-Irish Treaty. It ceased circulation in 1922 and the ISDL itself was disbanded in 1925.
