= Winchester College in fiction =

Public school in Hampshire, England

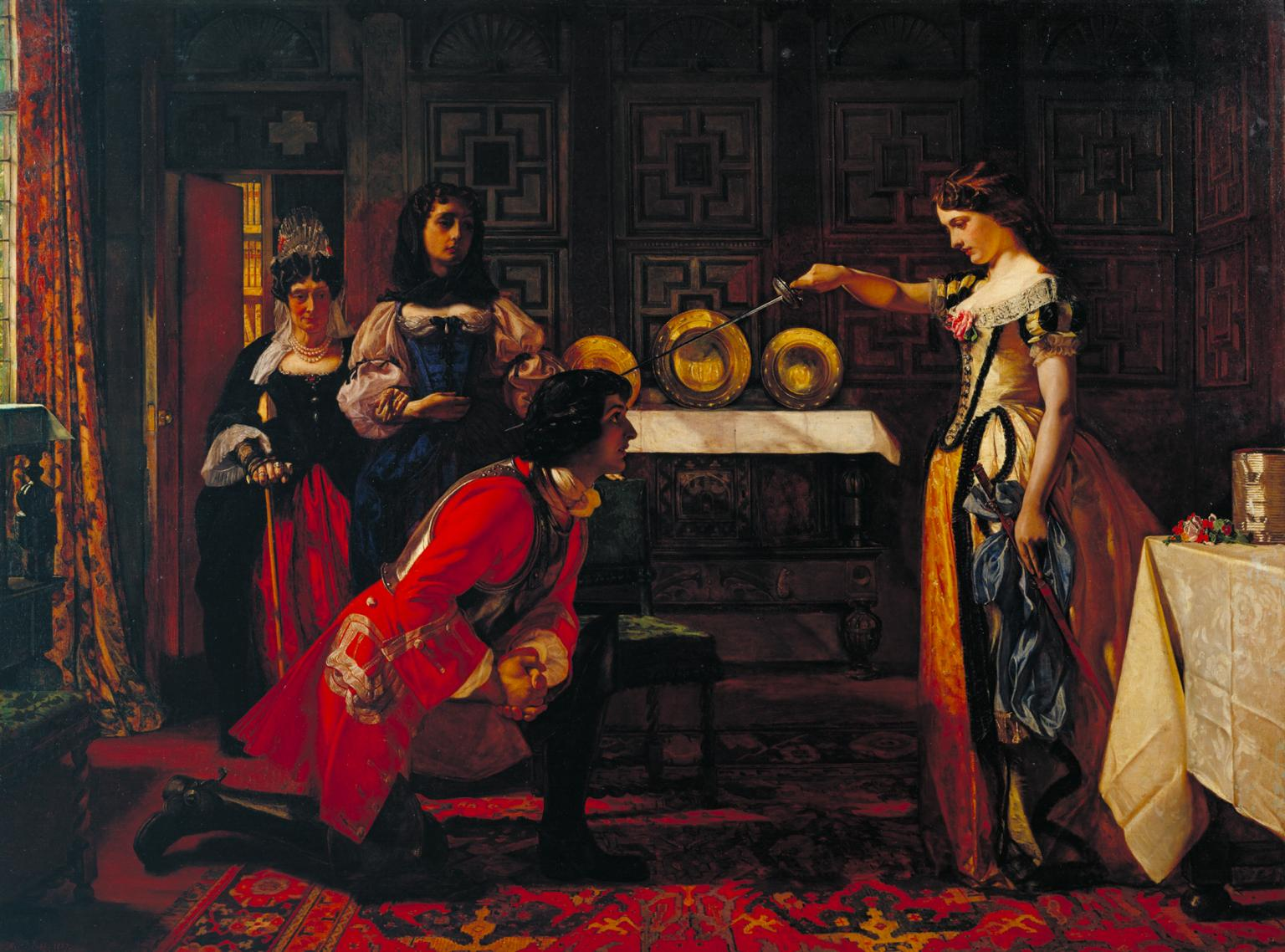
Henry Esmond, Old Wykehamist, protagonist of a book by William Makepeace Thackeray, being knighted by Beatrix, with whom he is in love, but fails to marry. Beatrix Knighting Esmond by Augustus Leopold Egg, 1857

Winchester College appears in fiction both as a school and as fictional Old Wykehamists, people who had been to the school. At least 50 fictional Old Wykehamists have appeared in novels, sometimes following the stereotype of the dull civil servant, though in fact relatively few real Wykehamists choose that profession. The school is further represented indirectly by the writings of Old Wykehamists on other topics.

== The school in fiction ==
=== Poetry ===
Amy Audrey Locke's 1912 In Praise of Winchester offers an anthology of over 100 pages of prose and verse about Winchester College. The poets represented in the book include the Old Wykehamists John Crommelin-Brown, Lord Alfred Douglas, Robert Ensor, A. P. Herbert, George Huddesford, Lionel Johnson, William Lipscomb, Robert Seton-Watson, Thomas Adolphus Trollope, Thomas Warton, and William Whitehead. Others in the collection include the biographer and suffragist Lady Laura Ridding, wife of one of the school's headmasters, George Ridding.

Huddesford edited an anthology of poetry by fellow Old Wykehamists called Wiccamical Chaplet, dedicated to the finance minister Henry Addington. Some of the poems are in Latin, including the school song, "Domum", subtitled by Huddesford "Carmen Wiccamicum" ("The Winchester College Song"). One of the poems, "On a Threat to Destroy the Tree at Winchester", alludes to "Domum", as indicated in its subtitle, "Round which [tree] the Scholars, on Breaking up [at end of term], sing their celebrated Song, called 'Dulce Domum'." Locke provides a verse translation along with the Latin version, and "A Domum Legend" which gives an alternative version of how the school song came into existence.

=== Prose ===
A former headmaster of Winchester College, James Sabben-Clare, comments that the school itself has been "largely spared the full fictional treatment". E. H. Lacon-Watson's 1935 book In the Days of His Youth however portrays the school in the 19th century under the headmastership of George Ridding, "thinly disguised as Dr. Spedding".

== Old Wykehamists in fiction ==
Sabben-Clare discusses how Wykehamists appear in fiction. He notes that James Bond's chaperon, Captain Paul Sender is just one of at least 50 Old Wykehamists in fiction, a dull civil servant, "overcrammed and underloved at Winchester". Sabben-Clare states that despite the stereotype of Wykehamists becoming Civil Servants, between 1820 and 1922 only around 7% of Wykehamists went into the Civil Service, and by 1981 the number had fallen to about 2%. On the other hand, Sabben-Clare writes, Wykehamists have always been drawn to law, with about ten entrants to the profession each year. He find it surprising that so few Wykehamist lawyers are found in fiction: he mentions Monsarrat's John Morell and Charles Morgan's Gaskony.

Fictional Wykehamists
Character	Author	Work	Date	Notes and quotes
Antrobus	Lawrence Durrell	Esprit de Corps	1957	Sabben-Clare calls Antrobus "portentous and serious minded", and wonders if Durrell knew of Sir Reginald Antrobus, Crown Agent for the Colonies 1909–1918.
Sir Humphrey Appleby	Antony Jay; Jonathan Lynn	Yes Minister TV series	1980–1984	Sir Humphrey Appleby (Winchester, Balliol, GCB, KBE, MVO, MA Oxon)
The Revd. Francis Arabin	Anthony Trollope	Barchester Towers	1857	"He was the younger son of a country gentleman of small fortune in the north of England. At an early age he went to Winchester, and was intended by his father for New College;" (Barchester Towers, Chapter 20, "Mr Arabin"). "The agreeable and cultivated vicar of St. Ewold, formerly professor of poetry at Oxford, who ends up as Dean of Barchester"
James Arrowby	Iris Murdoch	The Sea, The Sea	1978	"a scholar with a gift for languages and mathematics as well as winning history prizes, a poet, traveller, connoisseur, a Buddhist convert, a mystic with apparently supernatural powers". Sabben-Clare suggests Arrowby might be based on the SOE officer Frank Thompson.
Edward Ashburnham	Ford Madox Ford	The Good Soldier	1915	"It is odd how a boy can have his virgin intelligence untouched in this world. That was partly due to the careful handling of his mother, partly to the fact that the house to which he went at Winchester had a particularly pure tone and partly to Edward's own peculiar aversion from anything like coarse language or gross stories." (The Good Soldier, Part 3, Chapter 3)
William Beckwith and Charles Nantwich	Alan Hollinghurst	The Swimming Pool Library	1988	"The diaries chronicle Nantwich’s education (Winchester and Oxford – just like Will)"
Captain Edward Bentinck-Boyle	Brian Degas	Colditz; TV series	1972–1974	Played by Neil Stacy. He catches out a German planted among the prisoners who claimed to be an Old Wykehamist but didn't know his "Notions".
George Bertram	Anthony Trollope	The Bertrams	1859	"a commoner", "stood forth to spout out the Latin hexameters, and to receive the golden medal" (page 12)
Lord Bognor	Harold Nicolson	Some People	1927	"a bigger version" of Paul Sender, well-dressed but "soulless, bland, removed from reality"
Brookfields	Pamela Frankau	The Willow Cabin	1949	"scholar-aesthete"
Richard Carstone	Charles Dickens	Bleak House	1852–1853	Carstone is "not helped by an allegedly inappropriate, non-vocational Wykehamist education"
Collins	Evelyn Waugh	Brideshead Revisited	1945	"scholar-aesthete", art historian, "an embryo don ... a man of solid reading and childlike humour." In the television series, Charles Ryder is shown wearing an Old Wykehamist tie.
Josiah Crawley	Anthony Trollope	Framley Parsonage; The Last Chronicle of Barset	1861	Not explicitly mentioned as a Wykehamist, but Francis Arabin refers to Crawley having been "at school and at college" with him.
Christopher Dysart	Somerville and Ross	The Real Charlotte	1894	"although the occasional glimpses vouchsafed of him during his Winchester and Oxford career were as discouraging as they were brief" (The Real Charlotte, Chapter 8)
Errol	Lawrence Durrell	Mountolive	1958	"diligent but dull, 'goat-like' Head of Chancery" in the Foreign Office
Colonel Henry Esmond, Viscount Castlewood	William Makepeace Thackeray	The History of Henry Esmond	1852	"a lively buccaneering spirit" whose year at "'the famous college'" had "passing little effect"
Basil Fawlty	John Cleese	Fawlty Towers TV series	1975–1979	Basil wears an OW tie in one episode
Gaskony	Charles Langbridge Morgan	The Judge's Story	1947	"the retired judge"
Sinclair Hammond	P. G. Wodehouse	Bill the Conqueror	1924	"at one of the large English schools – possibly Winchester. Hammond was at Winchester." (Bill the Conqueror, page 225)
Peter Hithersay	Nicholas Shakespeare	"Snowleg"	2004	"Peter sat in Mugging Hall waiting to hear his name. 'Liptrot?' 'Sum.' ... he drew the tangerine curtain of his 'toyes', the wooden stall ... that encompassed his private world away from home ... it was compulsory to wear a 'strat', a straw boater bought at phenomenal expense from Gieves & Hawkes [in Kingsgate Street] ... Peter would wander beside the Itchen" (Snowleg, Chapter 1)
Mycroft Holmes and Sebastian Holmes	Brian Freemantle	The Holmes Inheritance	2004	Sherlock Holmes's brother and son, respectively. Sebastian sends reports to his father in a code based on Notions.
Alroy Keir	W. Somerset Maugham	Cakes and Ale	1930	"Roy started with certain advantages. He was the only son of a civil servant who after being Colonial Secretary for many years in Hong-Kong ended his career as Governor of Jamaica. When you looked up Alroy Kear in the serried pages of Who’s Who you saw o.s. of Sir Raymond Kear, K.C.M.G., K.C.V.O. q.v. and of Emily, y.d. of the late Major General Percy Camperdown, Indian Army. He was educated at Winchester and at New College, Oxford" (Cakes and Ale, Chapter 1)
A. V. Laider	Max Beerbohm	Seven Men (and two others)	1919	Possibly: he says "I was at Winchester with Blake", but the point of the story is that he was a pathological liar.
The Labour MP	Robert Harling	The Enormous Shadow	1955	In line with "the myth of the [Old Wykehamist as a] socialist politician"
Mr Lamplough	Dorothy L. Sayers	In the Teeth of the Evidence	1939	A dentist in one of the Lord Peter Wimsey stories
Hamo Langmuir	Angus Wilson	As If By Magic	1973	"scholar-aesthete", "brilliant but unstable plant-geneticist"
Dexter Mayhew	One Day	David Nicholls	2009 novel, 2011 film	"covers some 16 years in the life of Emma Morley (Anne Hathaway), a working-class bluestocking educated at a Yorkshire comprehensive, and Dexter Mayhew (Jim Sturgess), a handsome upper-middle-class Wykehamist"
General Melchett	Richard Curtis; Ben Elton	Blackadder Goes Forth	1989	Portrayed by Stephen Fry
Merlyn	T. H. White	The Sword in the Stone	1938	gold medal for being "the best scholar at Winchester". Republished in the 1958 The Once and Future King
Michael Mont	John Galsworthy	The Forsyte Saga	1922	Suspected of being "a sort of socialist"
John Morrell	Nicholas Monsarrat	The Cruel Sea	1951	A barrister before joining the Royal Navy; "a living reproof to the solecism of displaying emotion"
Edgar Naylor	Cyril Connolly	The Rock Pool	1936	"and in places where no Wykehamist, no New Collegeman, no stockbroker, no Naylor had ever previously trod." (The Rock Pool)
Odoreida	Stephen Potter	Lifemanship books	1950–1970	"The intellectual prowess of the Wykehamist is one of his most widely recognized attributes ... G. Odoreida, one of Stephen Potter's most celebrated Lifemen"
Pappenhacker	Evelyn Waugh	Scoop	1938	"'the cleverest man in Fleet Street', who liked playing with a toy train which he would address in Latin Alcaics"
The spy Larry Pettifer and his controller Tim Cranmer	John le Carré	Our Game	1995	The ambiguous title denotes both espionage and "Winchester Football, a game so arcane that even experienced players may not know all the rules". [Cranmer, when a boy:] "‘I’ll give you one chance,’ I say expansively. ‘What is the Notion for Winchester Football?’ It is the easiest test I can think of in the entire school vernacular, a gift. ‘Jew-baiting’, he [Pettifer] replies. So I have no alternative but to beat him, when all he needed to say was Our Game."
Peregrine Pickle	Tobias Smollett	The Adventures of Peregrine Pickle	1751	"Before he had been a full year at Winchester, he had signallized himself in so many achievements, in defiance to the laws and regulations of the place, that he was looked upon with admiration, and actually chosen dux, or leader, by a large body of his contemporaries." (Chapter 16)
Psmith	P. G. Wodehouse	The Lost Lambs; Psmith in the City; Psmith, Journalist; Leave It to Psmith	1909–1923	Wodehouse said he based Psmith on Rupert D'Oyly Carte, a school acquaintance of a cousin of Wodehouse. Rupert's daughter, Bridget D'Oyly Carte, however, said that the Wykehamist schoolboy was not her father but his elder brother Lucas.
Mr Ramsey	Tobias Wolff	Old School	2003	"Mr. Ramsey had once told us about a riot of boys at his old school, Winchester, back in 1793, that finally had to be put down by a regiment of dragoons." (Chapter 6, "The Forked Tongue", page 103)
Captain Paul Sender	Ian Fleming	The Living Daylights	1966	"a lean, tense man in his early forties ... [in] the uniform of his profession – well-cut, well-used light-weight tweeds in a dark green herringbone, a soft white silk shirt and an old school tie – in his case, Wykehamist. At the sight of the tie ... Bond's spirits, already low, sank another degree. He knew the type: backbone of the Civil Service, overcrammed and underloved at Winchester, a good Second in P.P.E. at Oxford; the war, staff jobs he would have done meticulously ..."
George Souldern	John Buchan	The Runagates Club	1928	"double First and University prizewinner"
Dr Spacely-Trellis	Peter Simple		1957 onwards	The go-ahead bishop of Bevindon
Rupert Willem von Starnberg ("Bill")	George MacDonald Fraser	Flashman and the Tiger ("The Road to Charing Cross")	1999	"'Tee jay?' I croaked, and he laughed. 'Aye ... guide, philosopher, and friend - showin' the new bugs the ropes. What did you call 'em at Rugby? I'm a Wykehamist, you know - and that was your doin', believe it or not!'"
Sir Derek Underhill and Freddie Rooke	P. G. Wodehouse	Jill the Reckless	1920	"Freddie looked at him as a timid young squire might have gazed upon St. George when the latter set out to do battle with the dragon. He was of the amiable type which makes heroes of its friends. In the old days when he had fagged for him at Winchester he had thought Derek the most wonderful person in the world, and this view he still retained." (Jill the Reckless, Chapter 1)
Revd. John Wentworth	Elizabeth Goudge	The Rosemary Tree	1956	"nice but ineffectual"
Arthur Wilkinson	Anthony Trollope	The Bertrams	1859	"as he thought Winchester good for his own son, he naturally thought the same school good for Sir Lionel's son. But Bertram was entered as a commoner, whereas Wilkinson was in the college" (The Bertrams, page 12)

== Sources ==
- Locke, Amy Audrey (1912). "Book II: The College". In Praise of Winchester: An Anthology in Prose and Verse. London: Constable and Company. pp. 145–285.
- Huddesford, George, ed. (1804). The Wiccamical Chaplet, A Selection of Original Poetry, Comprising Smaller Poems, Serious and Comic; Classical Trifles; Sonnets; Inscriptions and Epitaphs; Songs and Ballads; Mock-Heroics, Epigrams, Fragments, &c. &c. York Street, Covent Garden, London: Leigh, Sotheby and Son.
- Sabben-Clare, James (1981). "Wykehamists of Fact and Fiction". Winchester College. Paul Cave Publications. pp. 177–190. ISBN 978-0-86146-023-6.
