= Our Game =

1995 spy novel by John le Carré

- First edition
- Author: John le Carré
- Language: English
- Genre: Spy fiction
- Published: 1995 Hodder & Stoughton
- Publication place: United Kingdom
- Media type: Print (hardback & paperback)
- Pages: 301
- ISBN: 9780679441816
- OCLC: 823/.914 20 L456
- LC Class: PR6062.E33 L43 1995b

Our Game is a 1995 spy novel by British writer John le Carré. It depicts Tim Cranmer, a retired British intelligence officer, searching for his missing friend and former double agent who has become involved in post-Soviet revolutionary politics. The title refers to Winchester College football; the two main characters were pupils at the public school Winchester College long before the setting of the novel.

== Plot summary ==
After the end of the Cold War and the fall of the Berlin Wall, British spymaster Tim Cranmer and his agent Lawrence 'Larry' Pettifer are retired from the Secret Intelligence Service. The two men had first met at public school, where Cranmer had taken Larry under his wing to protect him from bullying. Later, they meet again at Oxford where Cranmer recruits, trains, and handles him for over twenty years before their retirement. Cranmer settles in Honeybrook, his inherited estate in Somerset, with his young mistress Emma, while Larry resumes his teaching position at Bath University. Not content with staying cloistered in Bath, Larry begins paying visits to Honeybrook and soon becomes a permanent fixture in their lives.

When Larry and Emma both disappear, Detective Inspector Bryant and Sergeant Luck of the Bath Police call upon Cranmer. Panicked by his encounter with the police, Cranmer contacts his former employers and is summoned to London where he learns that, not only has Larry disappeared, he has absconded with £37 million from the Russian Government with the help of a former Soviet spy. Cranmer finds himself suspected as Larry's accomplice by the Bath Police—and, later, by "The Office", or SIS, and decides to track down his protégé and his former mistress.

Cranmer begins calling on old contacts from Oxford to the arms trade and visits his secret archive of Office files, hidden in the abandoned church of St. James the Less, bequeathed to him by the same uncle who left him Honeybrook. Cranmer begins to uncover the plot between Larry and Constantin Checheyev, also known as "C.C.", the former Soviet handler of Larry (Larry had pretended to work for the KGB during the Cold War as a double agent). It is revealed that Checheyev is not Russian but an Ingush, a native of the North Caucasus, who resented the Russians for displacing his people from their rightful homes. The missing money had been taken by Larry to prepare the Ingush for an uprising against their Russian oppressors.

Cranmer visits an arms dealer in Macclesfield, whom he finds murdered along with his assistants by an Ossetian group called "The Forest". He finds Emma, who has given up on Larry and has sought shelter in Paris; then he travels to Russia to track down his former Soviet contacts in the hopes of finding Larry. Finally, he reaches Ingushetia and learns that Larry has perished in the revolutionary struggle. The novel ends with Cranmer deciding to join the Ingush rebels.

== Characters ==
- Tim 'Timbo' Cranmer: A cynical former SIS spymaster and Larry's former British handler
- Lawrence 'Larry' Pettifer: A former British double agent pretending to work for the KGB and a quixotic intellectual
- Emma Manzini: Cranmer's young mistress, later Larry's lover
- Konstantin Checheyev: Larry's former KGB handler
