= Winchester College football =

Code of football played at Winchester College

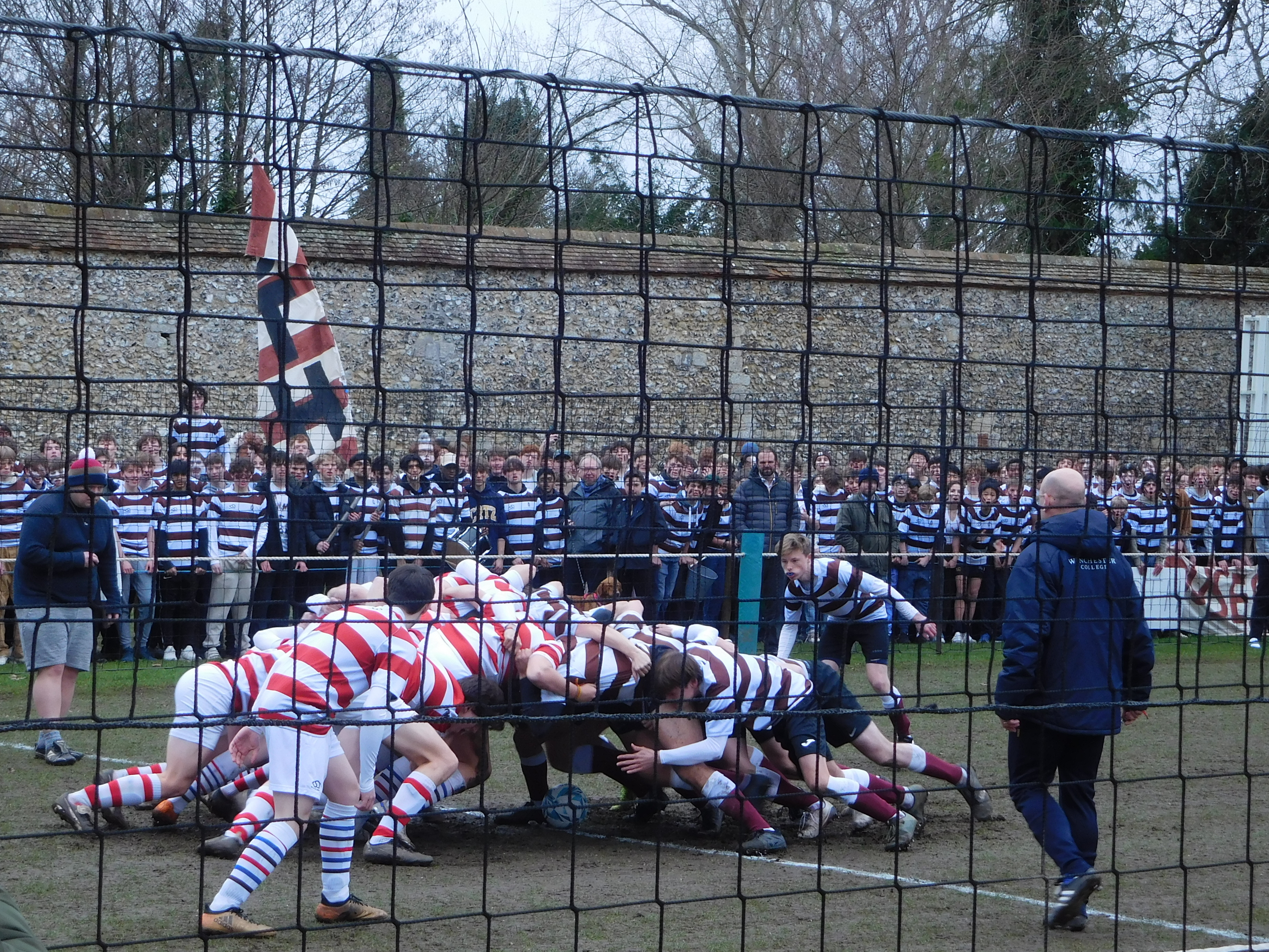
A match between Commoners (red stripe) and Old Tutor's Houses (brown stripe) in Meads begins with a hot (scrum) on the halfway line. Supporters watch from behind ropes (rope with blue posts) and a safety net.

Winchester College football, also known as Winkies, is a code of football played at Winchester College in Hampshire, England. Its rules make it somewhat resemble rugby football but with a round football and little handling of the ball. It was once played in South Africa, but is now restricted to the community directly connected to Winchester College. The game's season is during the spring term from January to March, the second term of the academic year. It developed from an unstructured street game of the 17th century into a standardised sport by the early 19th century. This was first played on the top of St. Catherine's Hill with a line of junior boys down each side to keep the ball from rolling away. The game was moved to the college's playing fields, and the lines of boys were replaced with netting. The main game has teams of 15, but in smaller competitions the teams may be of 10 or 6 players.

== Rules ==
The game somewhat resembles rugby football, as players can kick the ball or run with it. The players attempt to score by kicking the ball over the end of the pitch. Tatler quotes a pupil's description of it as "our combination of football and rugby, likened to an English bulldog playing with a ball". The Financial Times commented that the game could substitute for the Ancient Greek game of Pankration, but that a "Kasparov-like mind" was necessary to cope with the ever-changing rules. The aim of the game is to kick the ball (an over-inflated soccer football) into worms – the area at either end of canvas. Unlike in Rugby football, a player need only kick the ball across the worms line to score.

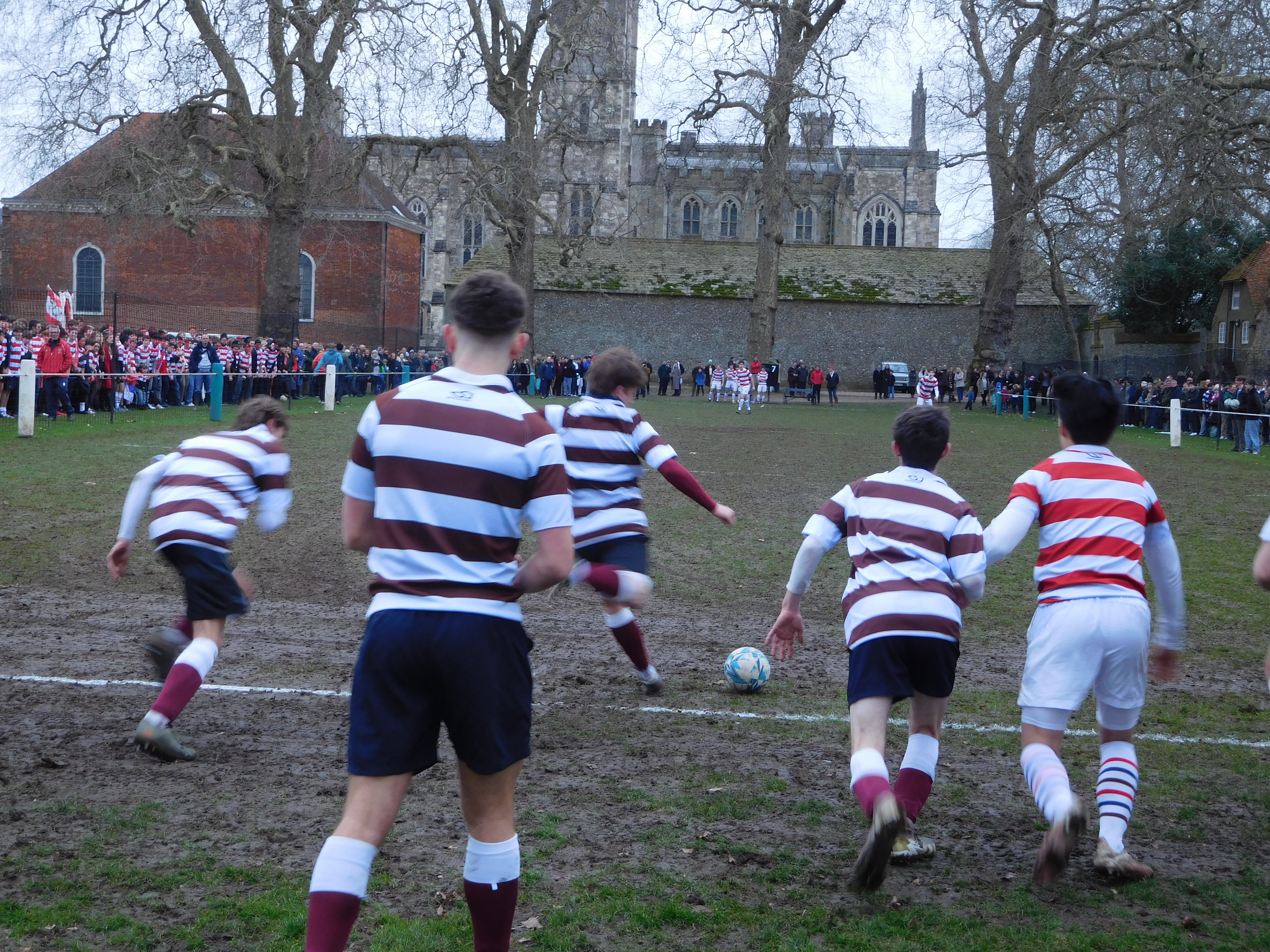
The Old Tutor's Houses team takes a kick from their goal line, worms, on Meads, with Chapel in the background.

The basic principle is that each team can only kick the ball once before the other team touches it (unless the kicker has been deemed to have kicked it his hardest). The main rules are called tag, dribble, behind your side, and handiwork.

- Tag occurs when a team-mate kicks the ball, and a player on his own team then kicks it without waiting for the other team to touch the ball. This means that passing forwards is not allowed.
- Dribble occurs when the same player touches the ball twice when the ball has not gone backwards, unless he has first kicked it as hard as he can. This means that dribbling as in soccer is not allowed.
- Behind your side (a kind of offside rule) is designed to stop players loitering at some position up the pitch. Once a player on your team kicks the ball, the rest of the team must endeavour to get back to the point where he kicked the ball from (not just behind the kicker as in rugby football) before they can move forward up the pitch.
- Handiwork is any illegal use of the hands. The rule allows somewhat more freedom than the handling rule in soccer. Only the kicks (full backs) may use their hands to control the ball. Any other player may catch the ball on the full toss, but use of the hands at any other time is deemed handiwork. A catch on the full toss by any player enables them to take up to three steps and then bust (punt) the ball.

Breaking any of these rules means that play is brought one or two posts back for a hot (scrum). Once the ball is out of the hot, the "hotwatches" (scrum-halves) try to get the ball past the hot, either to kick the ball into worms, or to kick the ball into ropes (off the canvas, resulting in a hot where the ball went out). Minor infringements result in a free bust.

The key points of the scoring system are that:

- A behind or 1 point is scored if the ball crosses into Worms after touching an opposition player or after going into ropes (between the rope and the netting), or if a team is awarded enough penalty Posts to send them back to worms (the final post along ropes).
- A conversion or 2 points is scored, following a behind, when an opposition kick from the point one metre in front of worms is returned by the team that scored the behind, and the ball crosses into worms; this converts the behind into a goal.
- A goal or 3 points is scored when the ball enters Worms without being touched by an opposition player and without being in ropes. After a goal is scored play resumes from a bust off.

== The pitch ==
The pitch or canvas for Winchester College Football, with the positions of the players for the 15-a-side game. The number of Kicks is reduced to 2 in games with fewer players.

Winchester football is played on a pitch known as a canvas, 80 metres long and 15 metres wide, flanked on either side by 2.5 metre high netting (confusingly called the canvas as well; as is the team squad) designed to prevent balls from being kicked off the pitch. Approximately a metre in front of the netting and running parallel to it is a thick rope, supported at a height of one metre by nine stout posts at intervals along the canvas (or seven posts, as on some of the smaller pitches on Palmer Field). The distance between two adjacent posts is known as a post; hence the total length of the canvas is normally eight posts. The inaccessible area between the ropes and the netting is known as ropes. The goal area off each end of the pitch is known as worms.

== Teams ==
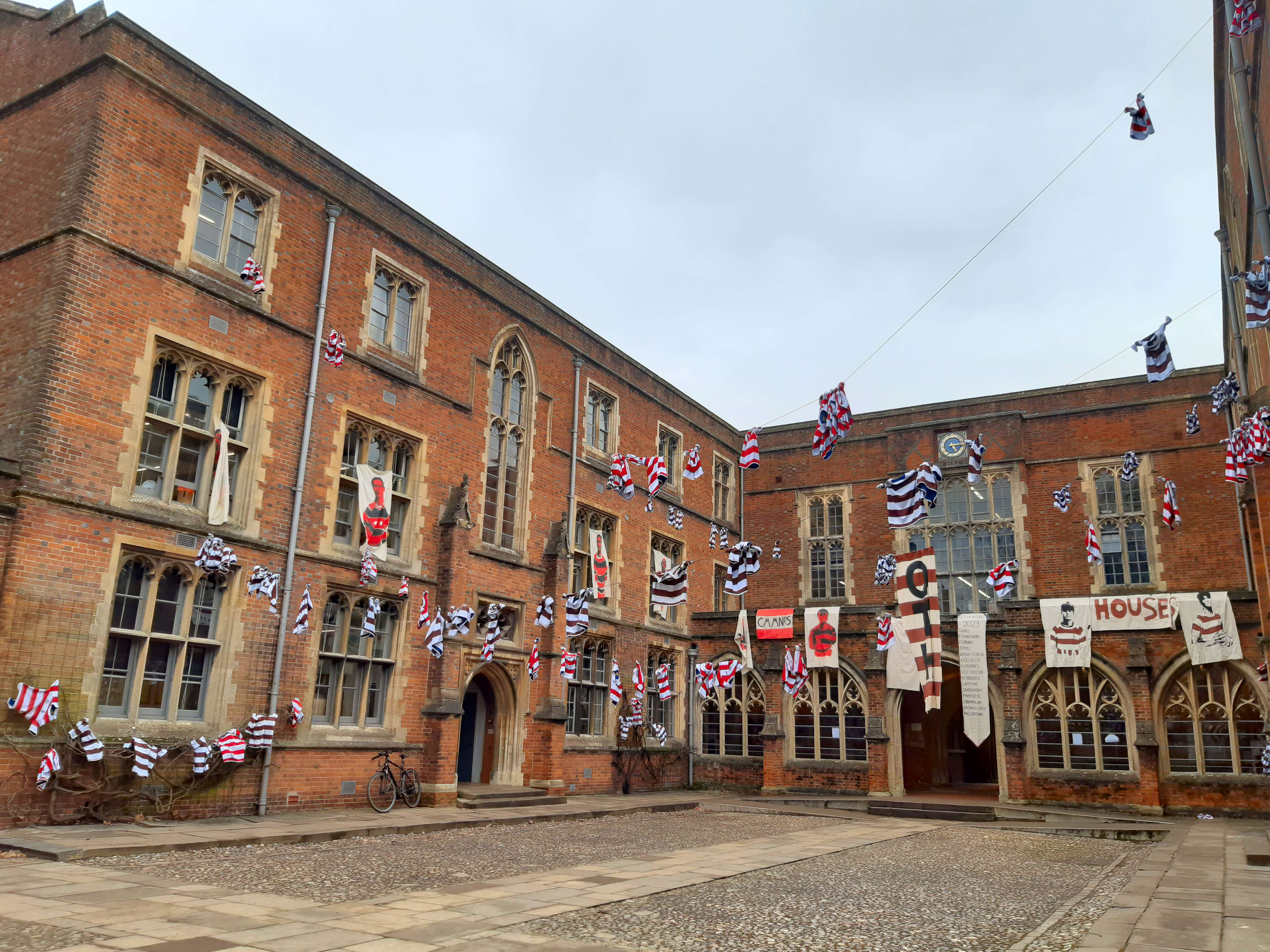
Flint Court on Winkies Day: the classroom buildings are decked out with Commoners and Old Tutor's Houses zephyrs.

Major matches are played with teams made up of 15 players, known as XVs; other matches can be played with smaller teams, usually 6 or 10, known as VIs and Xs respectively. In VIs, there are two kicks (full-backs), one hotwatch (half-back) and three hot (scrum) players. In Xs, there are two kicks, three hotwatches and five hot players. In XVs there are three kicks, four hotwatches and eight hot players. The team sizes may differ sometimes in smaller house competitions, with IXs and XIs being common-place. The players' roles are as follows:

- Kick: a defensive role between a full-back in Rugby football and a goalkeeper in soccer, the kick plays at the back of the field and may use their hands to control the ball.
- Hotwatch: like a half-back in Rugby football, awaits the ball emerging from the hot, and may pass the ball backwards (without using their hands) or kick it forwards.
- Hot: like the scrum in Rugby football, pushes against the other team's hot, and attempts to heel the ball back to their hotwatches, or to keep the ball in the hot and advance up the field. When the members of the hot are not in an actual scrum, they kick the ball.

Major matches are played between three teams, called Old Tutor's Houses (OTH), Commoners, and College. OTH wear brown and white striped zephyrs (football shirts), and consist of pupils from Furley's, Toye's, Cook's, Chawker's, and Hopper's boarding houses. Commoners wear red and white striped zephyrs, and consist of pupils from Kenny's, Freddie's, Phil's, Trant's, and Beloe's. College wear blue and white striped zephyrs, and consist only of pupils from College, the scholars' institution.

== History ==
Sketch map of Winchester College, with clickable links. The game was once played on St Catherine's Hill, and then on Meads (inside the college walls) or outside on fields including Ridding Meads and Kingsgate Park. All locations and building outlines are diagrammatic.

In the 17th century, Winchester football was played in Kingsgate Street; each team attempted to move a football from one end to the other, with little in the way of rules. The game was then moved away from the college to the flat, grassy top of St. Catherine's Hill. The game persisted with few rules, but required a long line of kickers-in, junior boys, on both sides of the pitch to keep the ball from rolling away down the hillsides.

By about 1825, the rules had been standardised and matches with large teams of 22 players, 20 in the hot (scrum) and 2 behinds (backs) were played between College (the scholars resident in the school's medieval buildings) and Commoners. The fundamental rules of "dribble" and "tag" were added at this stage. By 1860, the game was moved from the top of St. Catherine's Hill to where it is played now, on Meads. The lines of kickers-in were then replaced by canvas sheets, resulting in the name "canvas" for the football pitch, and soon afterwards by netting to allow people to watch the game without the aid of a ladder.

By 1901, teams had been reduced to 15, with 8 in the hot, 3 "hotwatchers" (scrum-halves), and 3 "behinds".

The earliest evidence of coloured shirts that identify football teams comes from Winchester football: an image from before 1840 is entitled "The commoners have red and the college boys blue jerseys." The use of coloured shirts at Winchester College was confirmed again in 1859: "Precisely at twelve o'clock, according to good old custom, the blue jerseys of college and the red of commoners mingled in the grand commencing 'hot'." That same year, Winchester College played a match of an undefined variety of football against the Winchester Garrison Officers; 28 "goals" were scored, with 11 players on each side, leading the historian Ian Denness to suggest that the rules were a hybrid of the Winchester and Eton football games.

Winchester football was the first variety of football played in South Africa, promoted by Canon Gorge Ogilvie, principal of the Diocesan College in Rondebosch; it remained dominant until 1878.

In 1941, General Archibald Wavell, an alumnus of Winchester (an Old Wykehamist), was congratulated by telegram for his success in pushing the Italian 10th Army back in North Africa with the words "hotting the enemy over worms" (pushing the hostile scrum back over the goal line). In 1996, another Old Wykehamist, John Whittingdale, speaking in Parliament in a debate on sport, said that "at school, I was forced to play a weekly game of fives, as well as a peculiarly brutal game known as Winchester College football, which normally resulted in substantial injuries to the participants." In the 21st century, the game has become known as Winkies. An older Winchester college notion for it is "Win Co Fo".

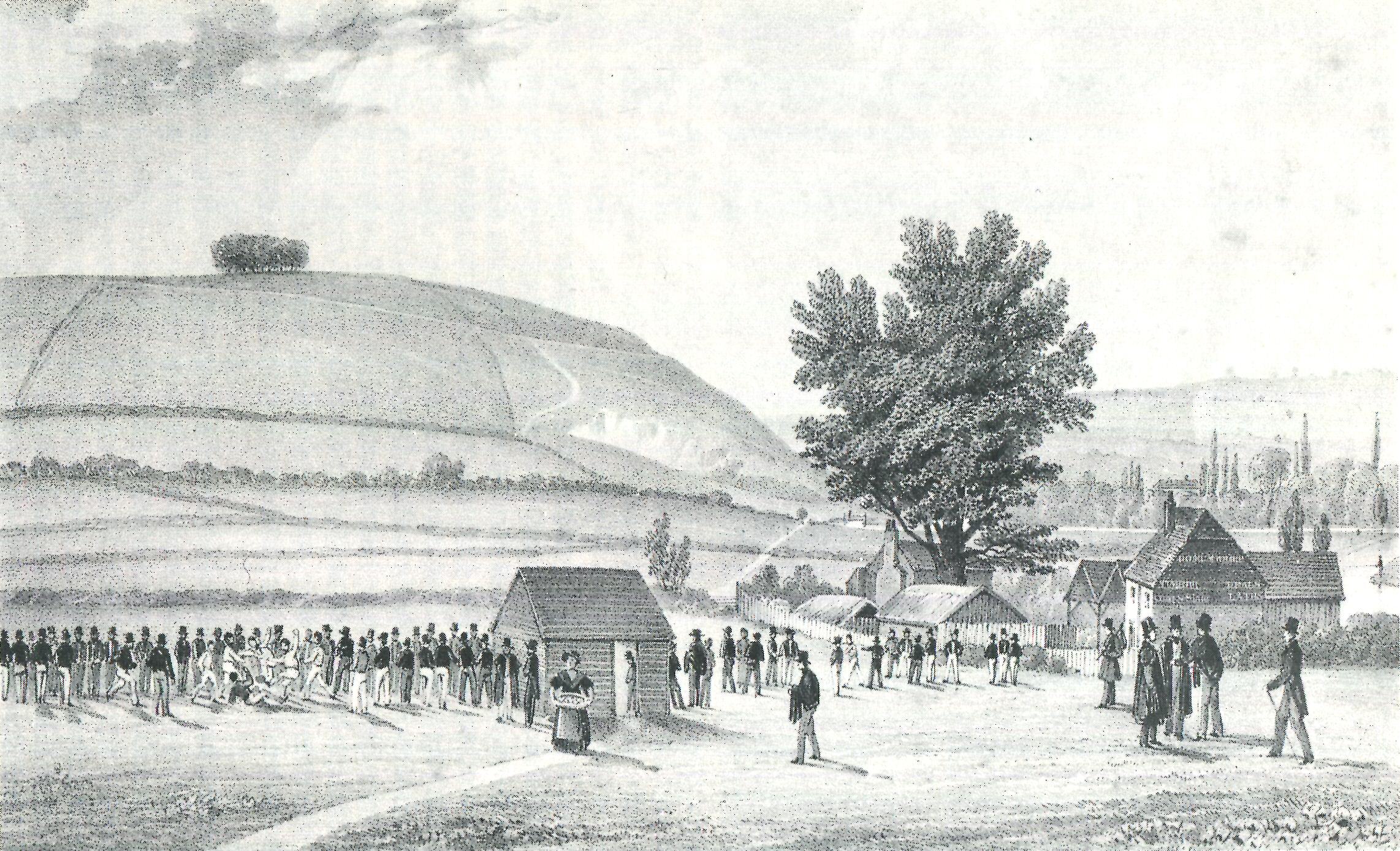
Illustration of Winchester football by Richard Baigent, 1838, showing lines of "kickers-in" on both sides of the pitch on Ridding Meads. The fairly flat-topped St. Catherine's Hill, where the game was once played, is in the background.

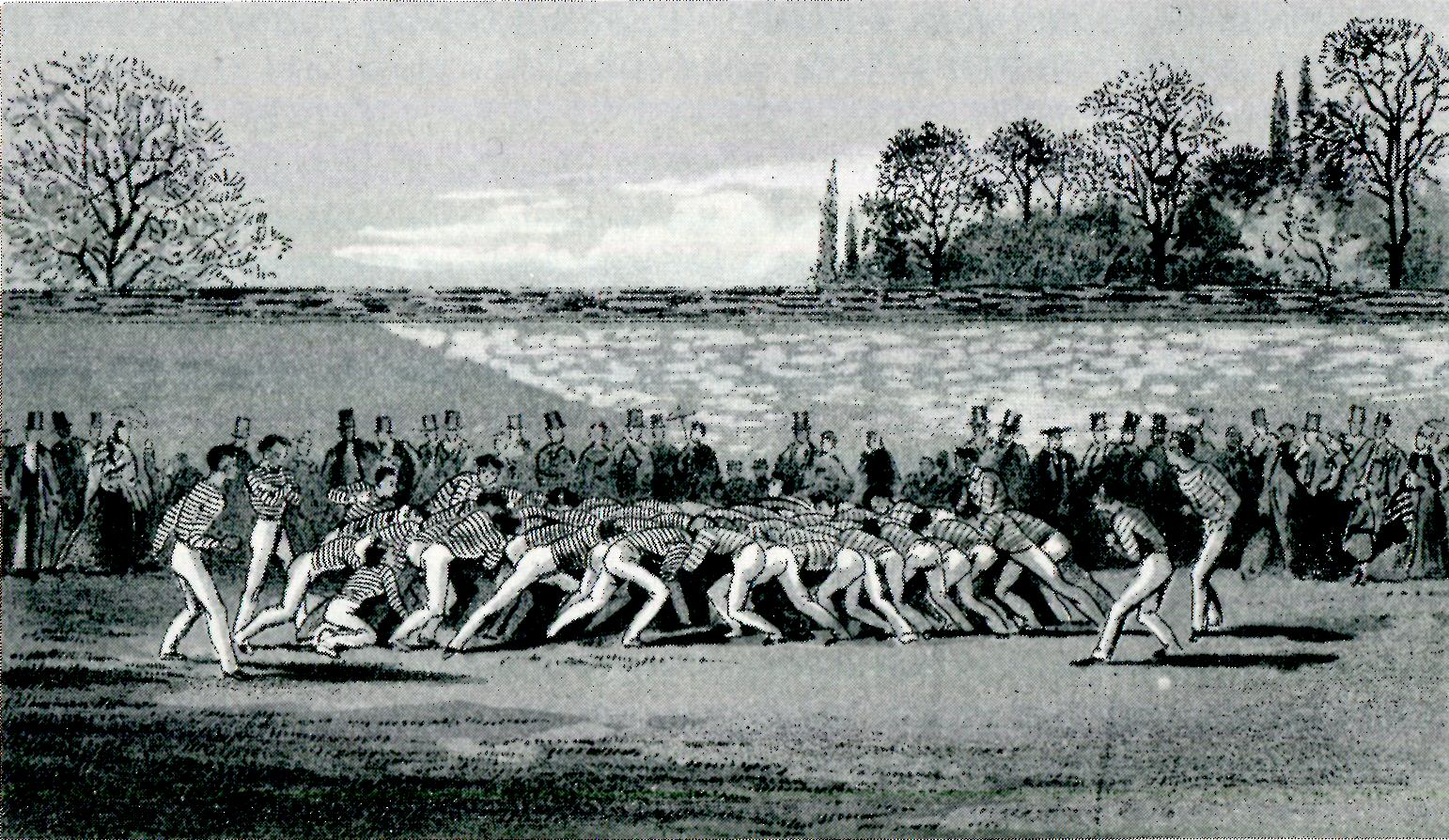
A "Hot" in a game of 22-a-side Winchester football in Meads, by R. B. Mansfield, 1866

== See also ==
- English public school football games
- Notions (Winchester College)

== Sources ==
- Fontes, Michael (10 January 2025). "An Elementary Guide to Win Co Fo". Winchester College.
- Lawson, W. H.; Hope, J. R.; Cripps, A. H. S. (1901). Winchester College Notions, by Three Beetleites. P. and G. Wells.
- Sabben-Clare, James P. (1981). Winchester College : after 600 years, 1382-1982. Paul Cave Publications. ISBN 0-86146-023-5. OCLC 10919156.
