= St Catherine's Hill, Hampshire =

Iron Age hillfort in Hampshire, England

Coordinates: 51°02′47″N 01°18′38″W

St. Catherine's Hill
- Site of Special Scientific Interest
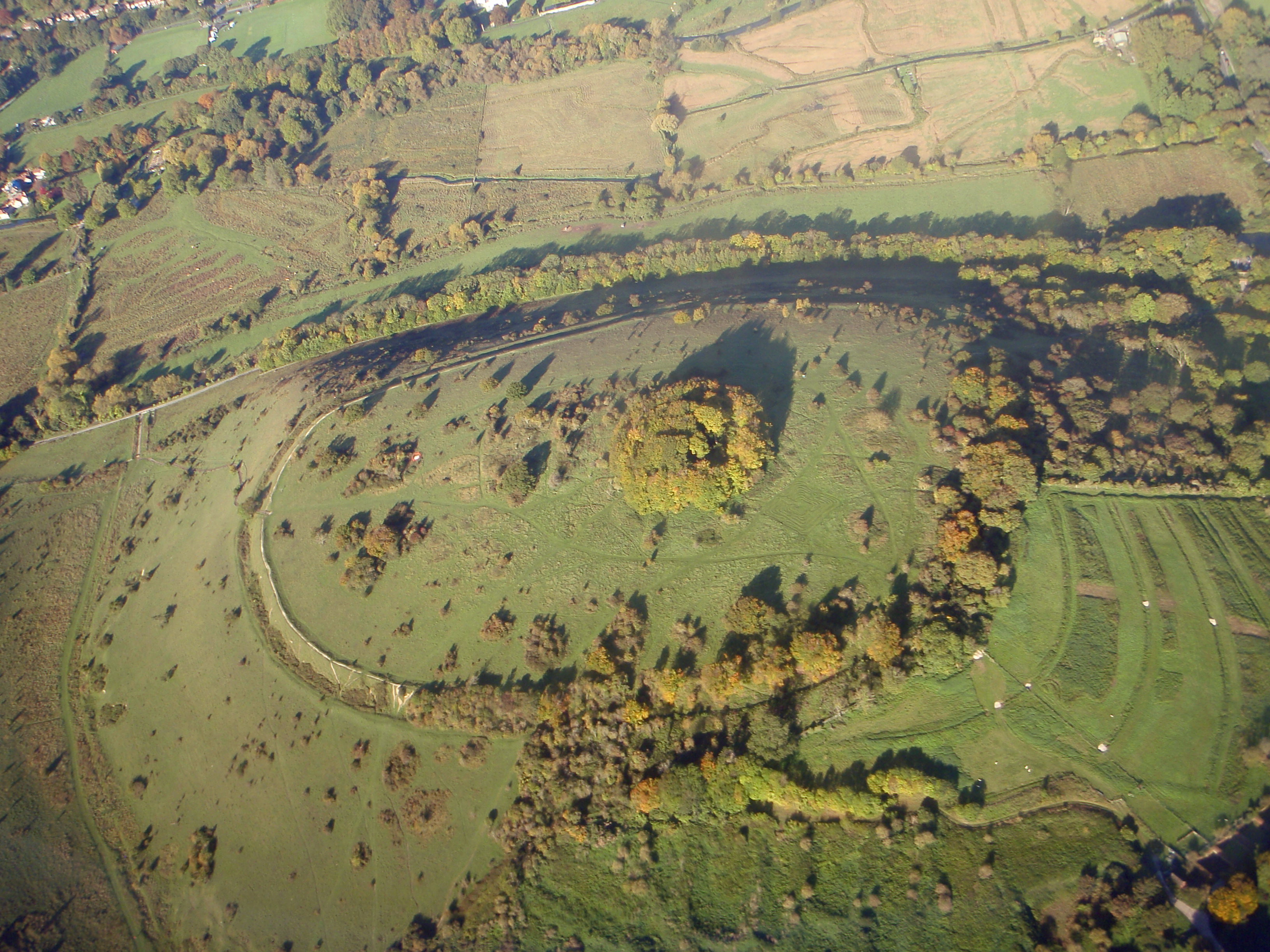
- Location of St. Catherine's Hill.
- Area of search: Hampshire
- Grid reference: SU 485 274
- Interest: Biological, historic
- Area: 43 hectares (110 acres)
- Notification date: 1986
- Location map: Magic Map

St. Catherine's Hill is a chalk downland hill and 43-hectare (110-acre) biological Site of Special Scientific Interest on the outskirts of Winchester in Hampshire, England. It is owned by Winchester College but open to the public. It is managed by Hampshire and Isle of Wight Wildlife Trust, and topped by an Iron Age hillfort, a scheduled monument. In the Black Death, plague pits were dug in the dry valley on the south side of the hill. In the Early modern period, a mizmaze was cut on the hilltop. Winchester College football used to be played on the hill; in an old custom, members of the college assemble on the hill every year, early in the morning.

Geologically, the hill is part of a local anticline in the chalk, which is of Turonian age in the Upper Cretaceous. The local ecology is dominated by the chalk, which results in a thin dark soil, a rendzina, which favours lime-loving plants from orchids to bellflowers.

== History ==
=== Iron Age ===
The top of St. Catherine's Hill is ringed by the ramparts of an Iron Age hillfort, a Scheduled Monument. The fortifications consist of a single rampart (univallate dump or glacis) with an outer ditch, begun in the Early Iron Age; much of the way around there is also a counterscarp bank. At the north-east side is an original entrance, with the rampart turned inwards. There is no evidence of an initial wooden rampart, unlike some other hillforts in Wessex. In the Middle Iron Age, c. 400–300 BC, the fortifications were made higher and the entrance was reshaped.

The site was occupied until the Middle Ages, as demonstrated by archaeological finds such as Iron Age pottery, a saddle quern, objects of worked bronze, iron, bone, and stone, as well as whetstones, spindle whorls, and remains of bones of sheep/goat, shorthorn oxen, horses, pigs, red deer, and dogs. From the Roman period there is pottery, a bronze coin of the emperor Carausius, and a bronze fibula.

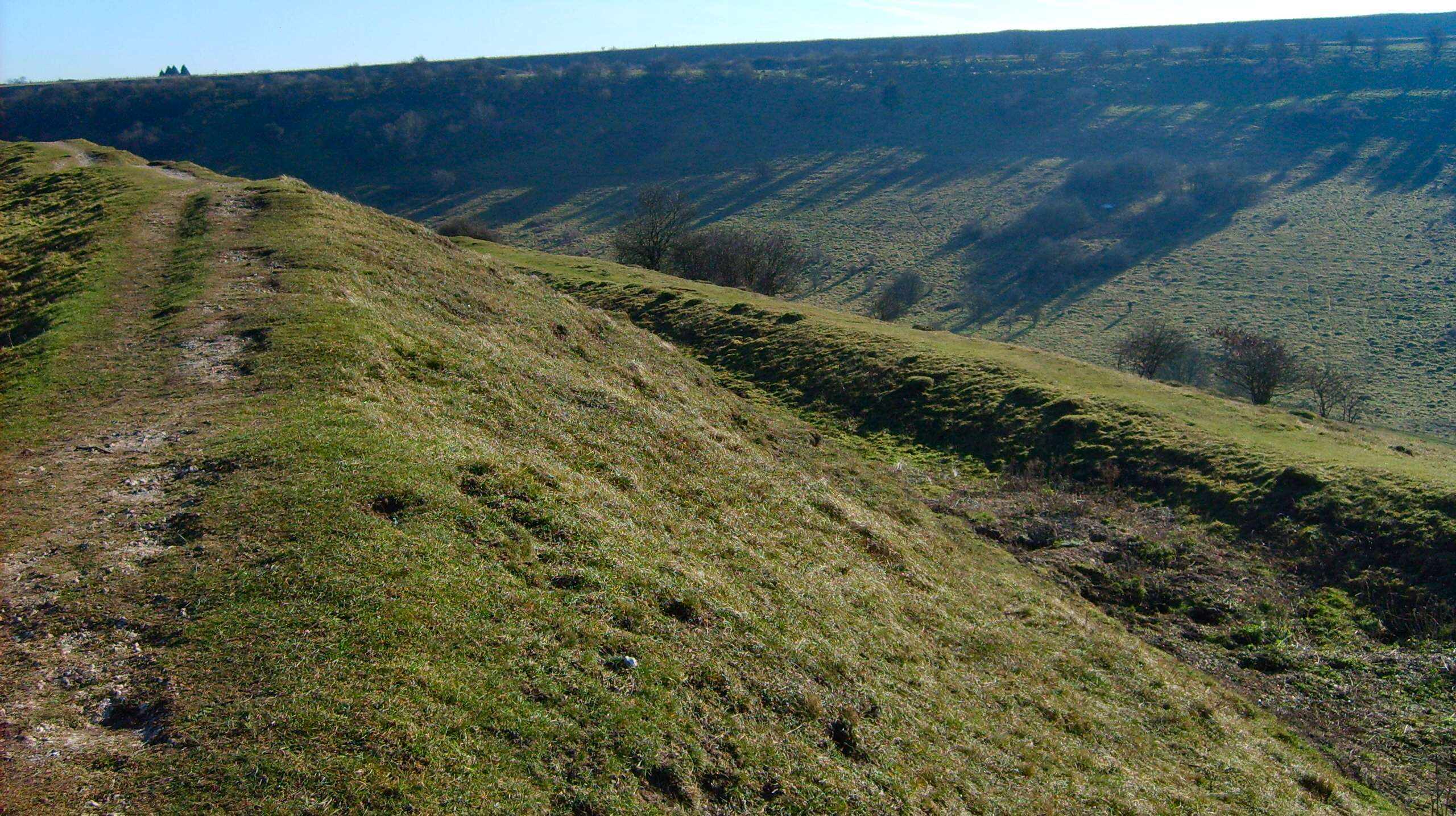
Iron Age rampart and outer ditch, with the dry valley in the background

=== Medieval to Early modern ===
At the top of the hill, a copse of beech trees contains the site of the 12th-century chapel of St. Catherine. In the 14th century, Black Death, bubonic plague killed many people in the area. Plague pits were dug in the dry valley beside the hill when all Winchester's graveyards became full. There is a mizmaze near the hilltop copse, probably cut between 1647 and 1710 in the Early modern period. It was remade between 1830 and 1840.

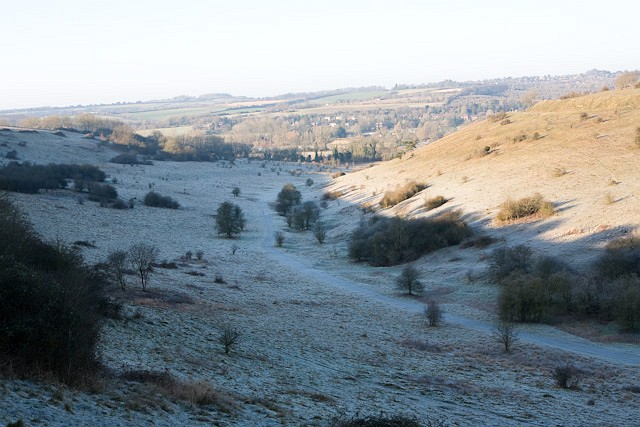
Plague Pits Valley. Burial pits were dug during the Black Death when the city's graveyards became full.

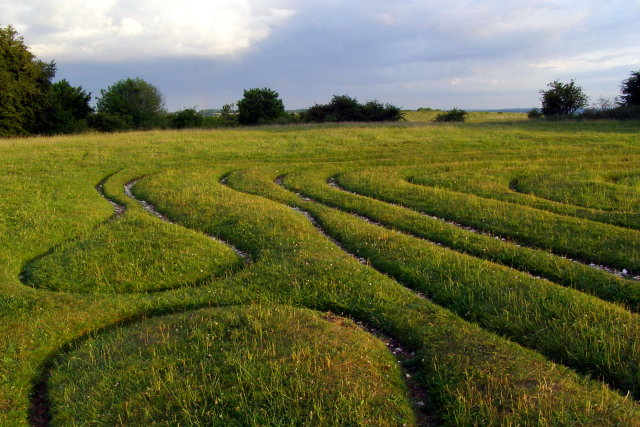
The mizmaze, probably cut between 1647 and 1710

=== Modern ===
Winchester College pupils and teachers assemble once a year, early in the morning, on top of the hill in one of its customs, "Morning Hills"; this is one of only a few regular whole-school assemblies practised by the college. The game of Winchester College football was formerly played on top of the hill; boys who were not playing stood beside the pitch to keep the ball from rolling down the hill. In 1922, The Old Wykehamist Lodge of Freemasons bought the hill and gave it to the college. The hill remains in the college's ownership, but is open to the public.

When the Didcot, Newbury and Southampton Railway was built in the 1890s, it separated the hill from the water meadows in the Itchen valley. The 1930s construction of the Winchester By-pass increased the severance. The hill has been rejoined to the city and college by the removal of the road, but it has been severed from the chalk hills on its east by the M3 motorway. That road, built in the 1990s, aroused the Twyford Down protests.

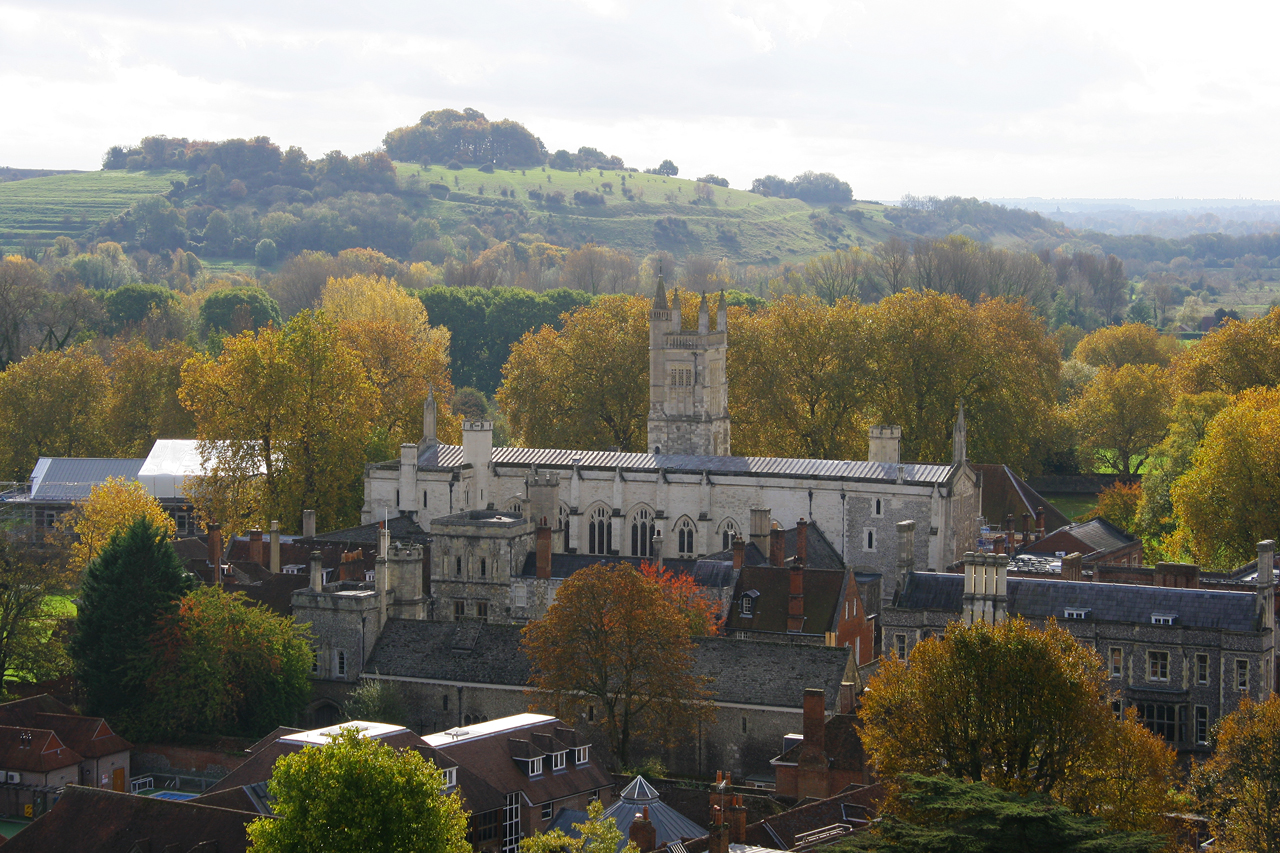
St Catherine's Hill seen above Winchester College Chapel

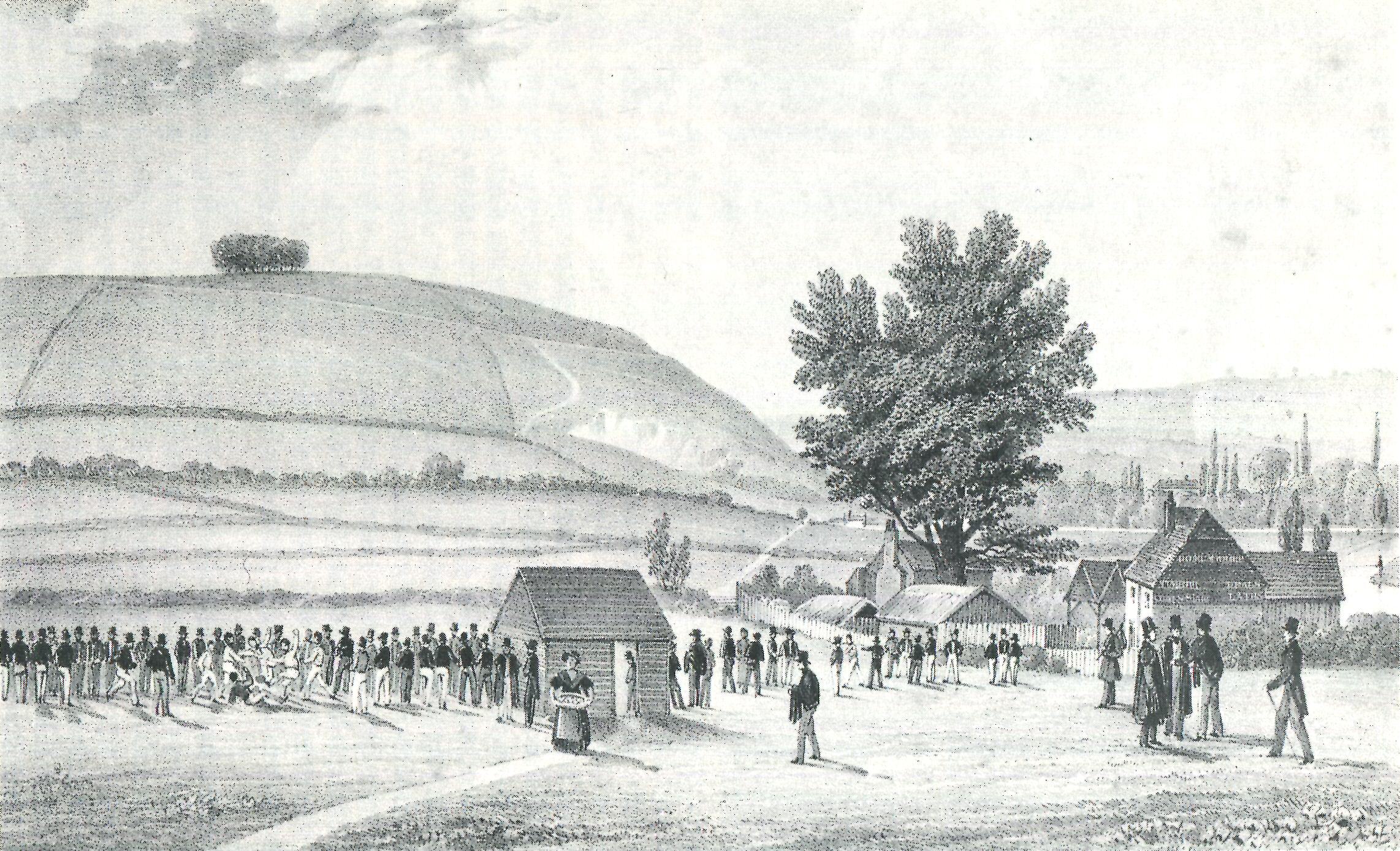
Engraving of St. Catherine's Hill as a bare hill in 1838, with a Winchester College football match, by then played in the Itchen valley rather than on the hilltop

== Natural history ==
=== Geology ===
St. Catherine's Hill is geologically within the upfolding of the chalk called the Winchester anticline. The anticline has eroded to expose older rocks to the north of the hill, with a surviving inward-facing circular escarpment encompassing St. Catherine's and other hills to the south, Oliver's Battery to the west, Magdalen Hill to the north, and Telegraph Hill and Chilcomb Down to the east. St. Catherine's Hill belongs to the roughly 90 million years old Upper Cretaceous 'New Pit Chalk Formation' within the Turonian stage. The hill is bounded to the south by Plague Pits Valley, a dry valley in the chalk of Twyford Down. To the west, the line of chalk hills has been transected by the River Itchen.

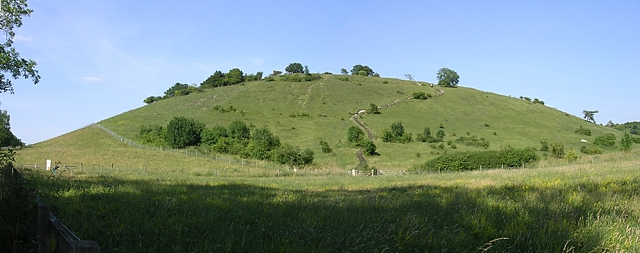
From the south

=== Ecology ===
The soil on the hill is a thin dark rendzina, directly on top of the chalk; it is thinnest high on the slopes, thickening into the valleys. This provides a varied set of local environments supporting a range of communities of flowering plants, including small populations of numerous downland species of orchids. Species uncommon for southern England include bastard toadflax and juniper. The hill has accordingly been designated a Site of Special Scientific Interest. It is managed by Hampshire and Isle of Wight Wildlife Trust.

Much of the site is chalk grassland, supporting the uncommon chalkhill blue butterfly. Where grazing has kept the grass short, the grassland is dominated by sheep's fescue grass, accompanied by lime-loving (calcicolous) plants such as common rock-rose, salad burnet, thyme, horseshoe vetch, kidney vetch, fairy flax, clustered bellflower, and orchids such as autumn lady's tresses and frog orchid.

The north-facing side of the dry valley beside the hill is covered with taller grasses such as meadow fescue and upright brome, accompanied by taller forbs such as basil, betony, wild carrot, yellow rattle, and perforate St John's wort. A feature of the plant community is the presence of forbs of relatively wet grassland, such as saw-wort, hemp agrimony, and devilsbit scabious.

There is some invasive scrub with bushes such as hawthorn, blackthorn, privet, dogwood, and wild rose, especially on the northern side. It is controlled by grazing and cutting. The hilltop wood consists of beech trees.

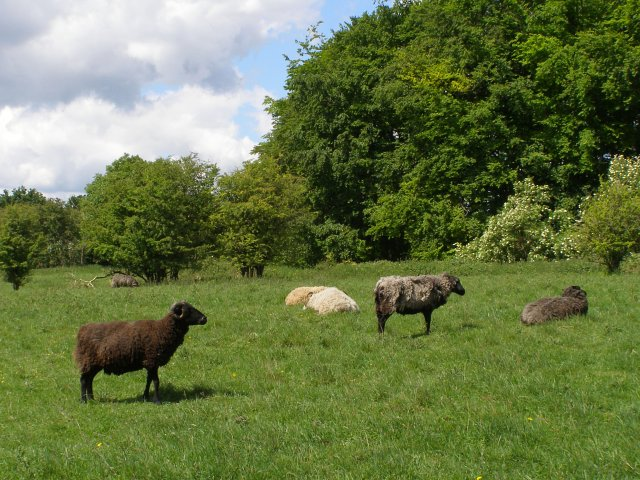
Sheep controlling scrub invasion, with the hilltop beechwood in the background

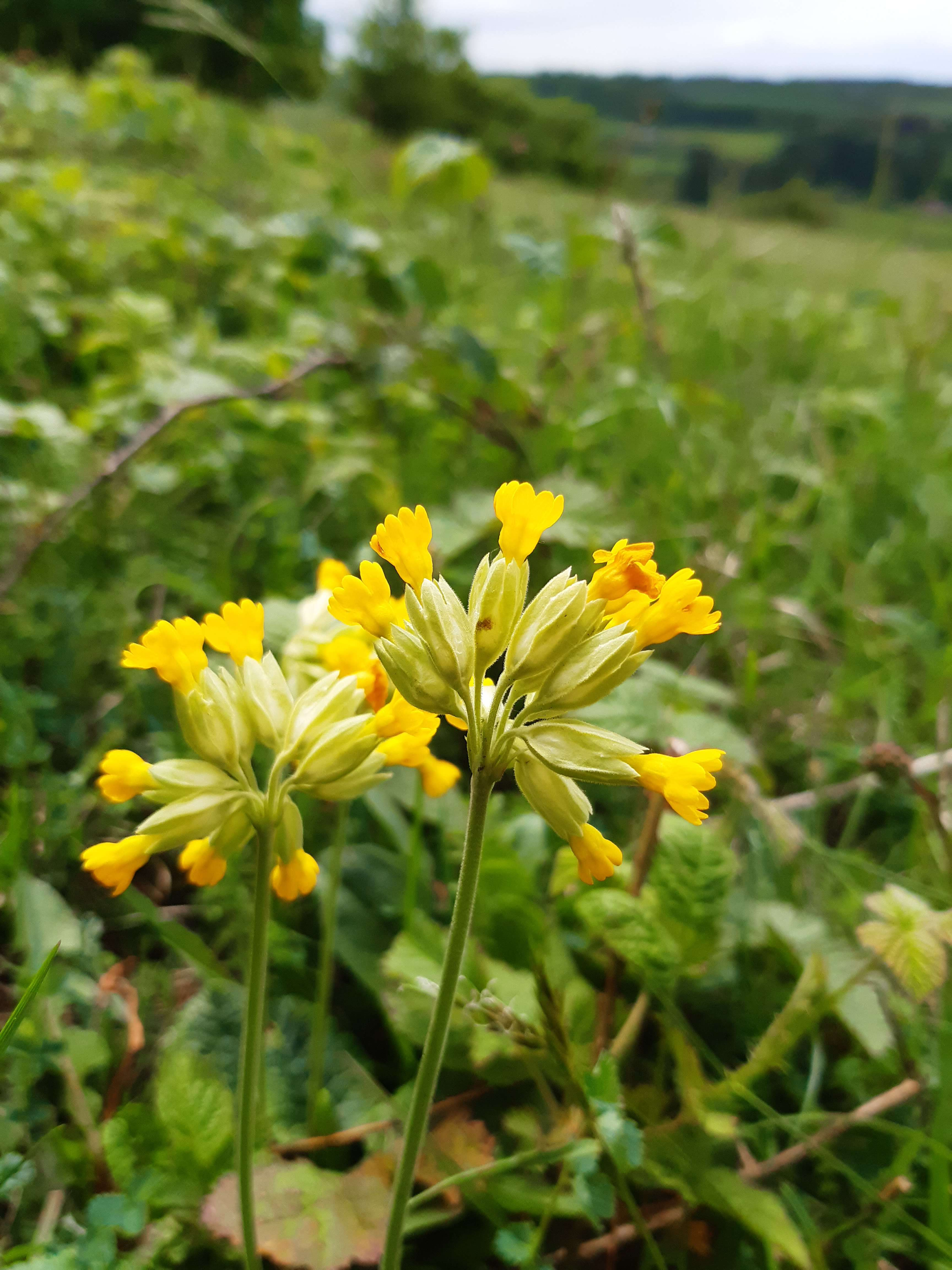
Primulas on the hilltop
