= Winchester College =

Public school in Winchester, England

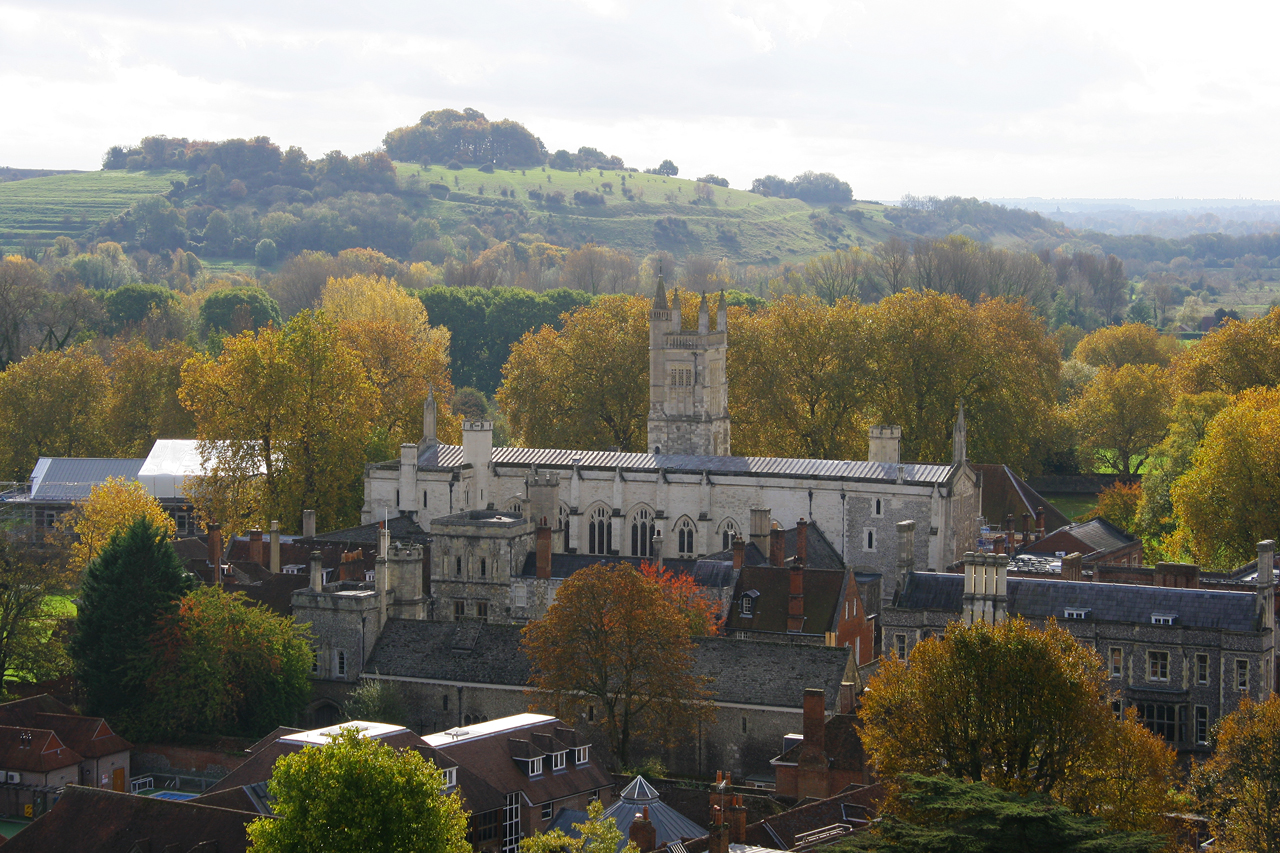
- The school seen from Winchester Cathedral

Location
- College Street; Winchester, Hampshire, SO23 9NA; England; 51°03′29″N 01°18′46″W

Information
- Type: Public school; Private co-educational boarding school with some day places
- Motto: Manners makyth man
- Religious affiliation: Church of England
- Established: 1382; 644 years ago
- Founder: William of Wykeham
- Department for Education URN: 116532 Tables
- Warden: Richard Stagg
- Headmaster: Elizabeth Stone
- Staff: c. 312
- Gender: Male (mixed at 16-18)
- Age: 13 to 18
- Enrolment: c. 740
- Houses: 13 (12 Commoner or Old Tutor Houses plus College): College; A. Chernocke House (Furley's); B. Moberly's (Toye's); C. Du Boulay's (Cook's); D. Fearon's (Kenny's); E. Morshead's (Freddie's); F. Hawkins' (Chawker's); G. Sergeant's (Phil's); H. Bramston's (Trant's); I. Turner's (Hopper's); K. Kingsgate House (Beloe's); L. St Cross; M. St Catherine
- Colours: Blue, brown & red
- Publication: The Wykehamist, Quelle, The Spirit Lamp, The Trusty Servant
- Alumni: Old Wykehamists
- School song: Domum
- Website: www.winchestercollege.org

Winchester College is an English public school (a fee-charging boarding school) for pupils aged 13–18 in Winchester, Hampshire. It was founded by William of Wykeham in 1382 as a feeder school for New College, Oxford, and has operated continuously on its present site ever since. It is the oldest of the nine public schools investigated by the Clarendon Commission. Historically, the school was a boys' boarding school, but from September 2022, it has accepted both male and female day pupils into its sixth form.

The school was founded to provide an education for 70 scholars, with a choir of 16 "quiristers" aged up to 12. Gradually numbers rose with paying pupils known as "commoners" alongside the scholars. Numbers expanded greatly in the 1860s with the addition of ten boarding houses. The scholars continue to live in the school's medieval buildings, which consist of two courtyards, a chapel, and a cloisters. A Wren-style classroom building named "School" was added in the 17th century. An art school ("museum"), science school, and music school were added at the turn of the 20th century. A war cloister was built as a memorial in 1924.

The school has maintained traditions including its mascot, the Trusty Servant; a set of "notions" forming a sort of private language; and a school song, Domum. Its headmasters have included the bishops William Waynflete in the 15th century and George Ridding in the 19th century. Former pupils are known as Old Wykehamists.

== History ==
=== Foundation and early years ===
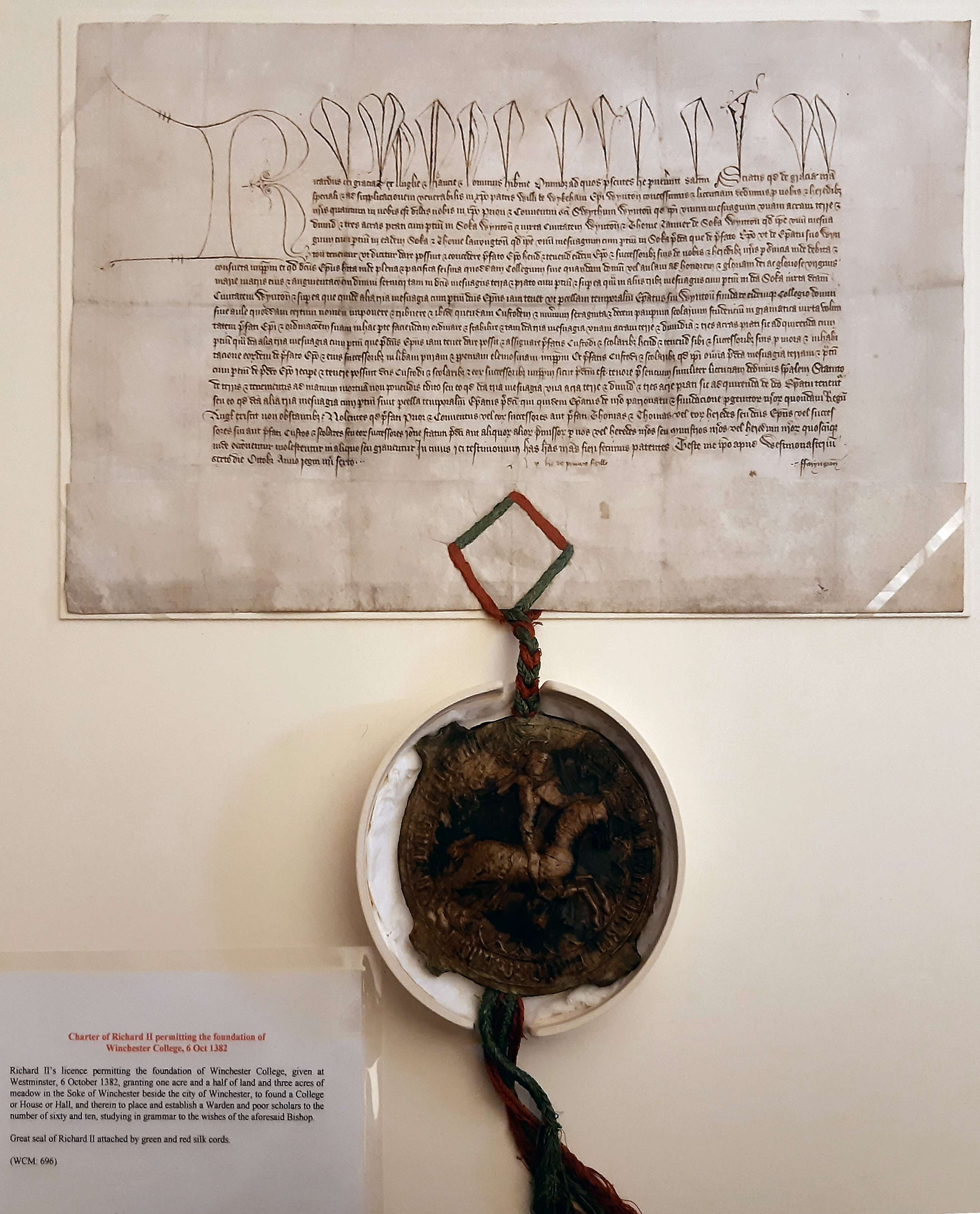
King Richard II's founding charter for Winchester College, 1382

Winchester College was founded in 1382 by William of Wykeham, Bishop of Winchester and Chancellor to both Edward III and Richard II, in part because of the lack of priests following the Black Death. Winchester was to act as a feeder school to New College, also founded by Wykeham. According to its 1382 charter and final statutes (1400), the school is called in Latin Collegium Sanctae Mariae prope Wintoniam ("St Mary's College, near Winchester"), or Collegium Beatae Mariae Wintoniensis prope Winton ("The College of the Blessed Mary of Winchester, near Winchester"). The first 70 "poor scholars" entered the school in 1394. In the early 15th century the specific requirement was that scholars come from families where the annual income was less than five marks sterling (£3 6s 8d); in comparison, the contemporary reasonable living for a yeoman was £5, annually.

Other innovations at Winchester included enforcing discipline through the pupils themselves, using prefects. Discipline was in any case meant to be less harsh than was common in medieval schools, at least as the statutes read. Winchester was also unusual in giving education to boys aged 12–18, as universities would accept students within this age range. These features, including the double foundation, formed the model for Eton College and King's College, Cambridge, some 50 years later. Eton and Winchester formed a close partnership at that time. At first only a small number of pupils other than scholars were admitted; by the 15th century the school had around 100 pupils in total, nominally the 70 scholars, 16 choirboys aged up to 12 known as "quiristers", and the rest fee-paying "commoners". Demand for places for commoners was high, and though at first restricted, numbers gradually rose.

=== Early modern period ===
As the college was a religious as well as educational establishment, it was threatened with closure during Henry VIII's reign. A statute to this effect was drawn up in 1545, which was only halted by his death. Edward VI swiftly reversed direction. Edward made provision for worship and Bible readings to be made in English rather than Latin. In the early modern period, under Henry, Edward, Elizabeth I and James I, royal visits were accompanied by presentations of Latin (and sometimes Greek) occasional poetry, composed by the pupils. Queen Elizabeth also granted an exemption to allow Winchester, Eton and elsewhere to conduct their religious services in Latin, to help pupils to improve their language skills.

=== Victorian era to present ===
From the 1860s, ten boarding houses, each for up to sixty pupils, were added, greatly increasing the school's capacity. By 2020, the number of pupils had risen to 690. From 2022, the school has accepted day pupils in the Sixth Form, including girls. In 2025 the college merged with The Pilgrims' School.

== Buildings ==
The college consists of an assemblage of buildings from medieval times to the present day. There are 94 listed buildings, set in grounds of some 250 acres, of which 100 acres are water meadows, 52 acres are playing fields, and 11 acres are formal gardens; the area includes St Catherine's Hill. The medieval buildings, representing most of the original foundation from the school's opening in 1394, include Outer Gate and Outer Court, Chamber Court, the chapel, and the Cloisters. These are built in flint with limestone facings and slate roofs. The chapel retains its original wooden fan-vaulted ceiling, designed by Hugh Herland, carpenter to Richard II. Little of the original medieval glass, designed by Thomas Glazier, survives, as it was scattered in the 1820s, but some is now housed in Thurburn's Chantry, at the back of the chapel, and in Fromond's Chantry, inside the Cloisters. The "School" building was constructed in 1683–1687 in Wren style, with a statue of the founder above the door by C. G. Cibber. The school was greatly extended in the 19th century with the addition of boarding houses for "commoners", paying pupils, as opposed to the scholars who continued to live in the medieval College. At the turn of the 20th century, a Music School, "Museum" (art school), and Science School, all architect-designed, were added. A hall big enough for the enlarged school, New Hall, was opened in 1961, accommodating the oak panelling removed from the Chapel in the 1874 refurbishment. In 1924, a War Cloister was constructed; it now serves as a memorial of the Wykehamists killed in the two World Wars. Visitors may tour areas such as Chamber Court, the chapel, College Hall, the Cloisters, School and Museum, for a fee.

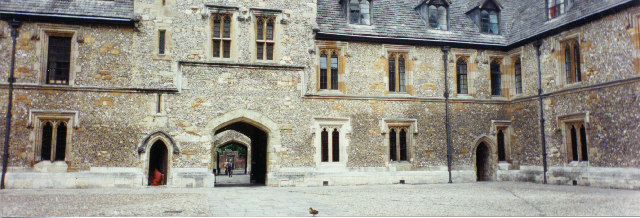
Medieval architecture: Chamber Court, 1394, looking through Middle Gate to Outer Court and Outer Gate

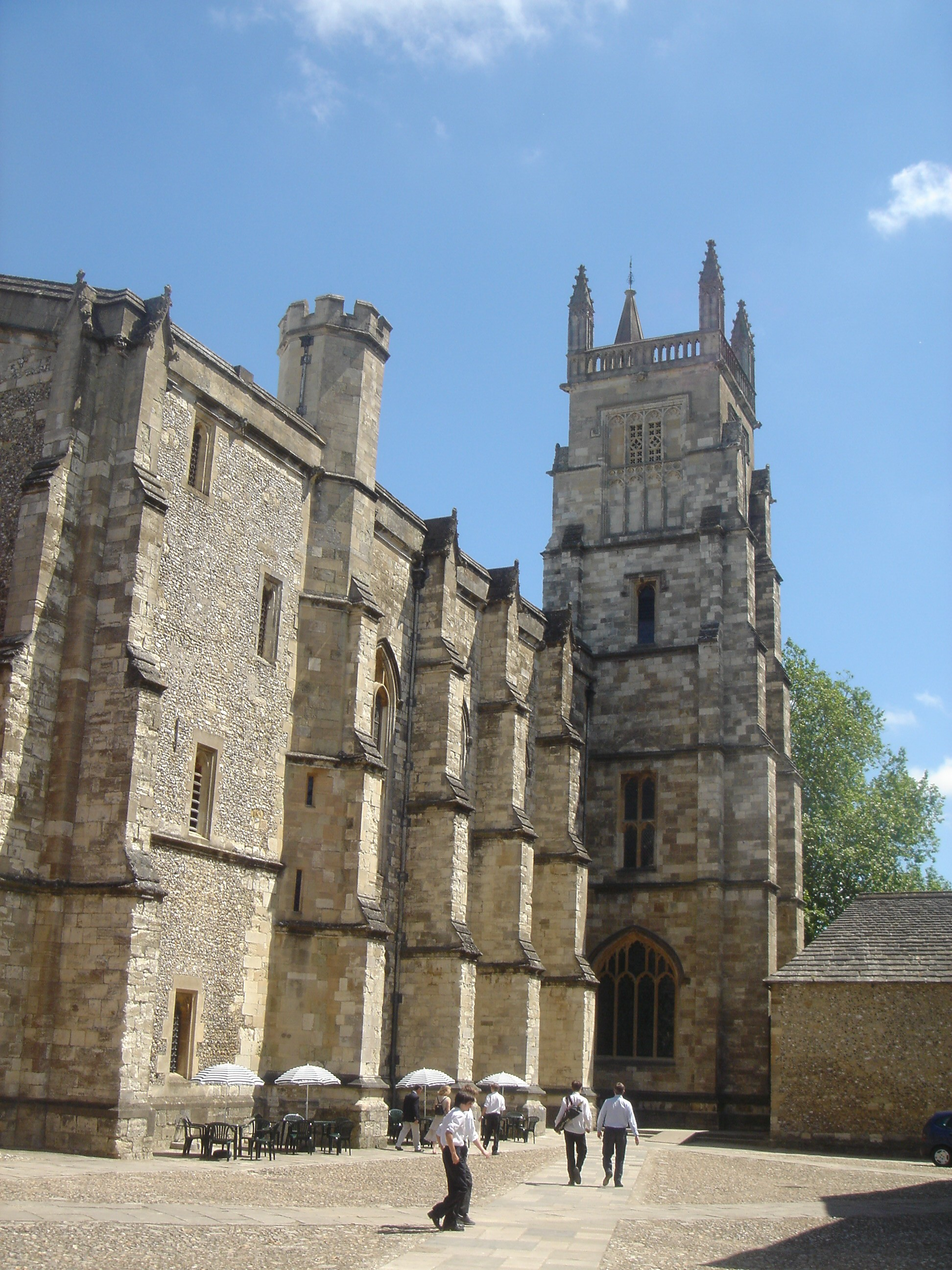
Hall and Chapel, 1394

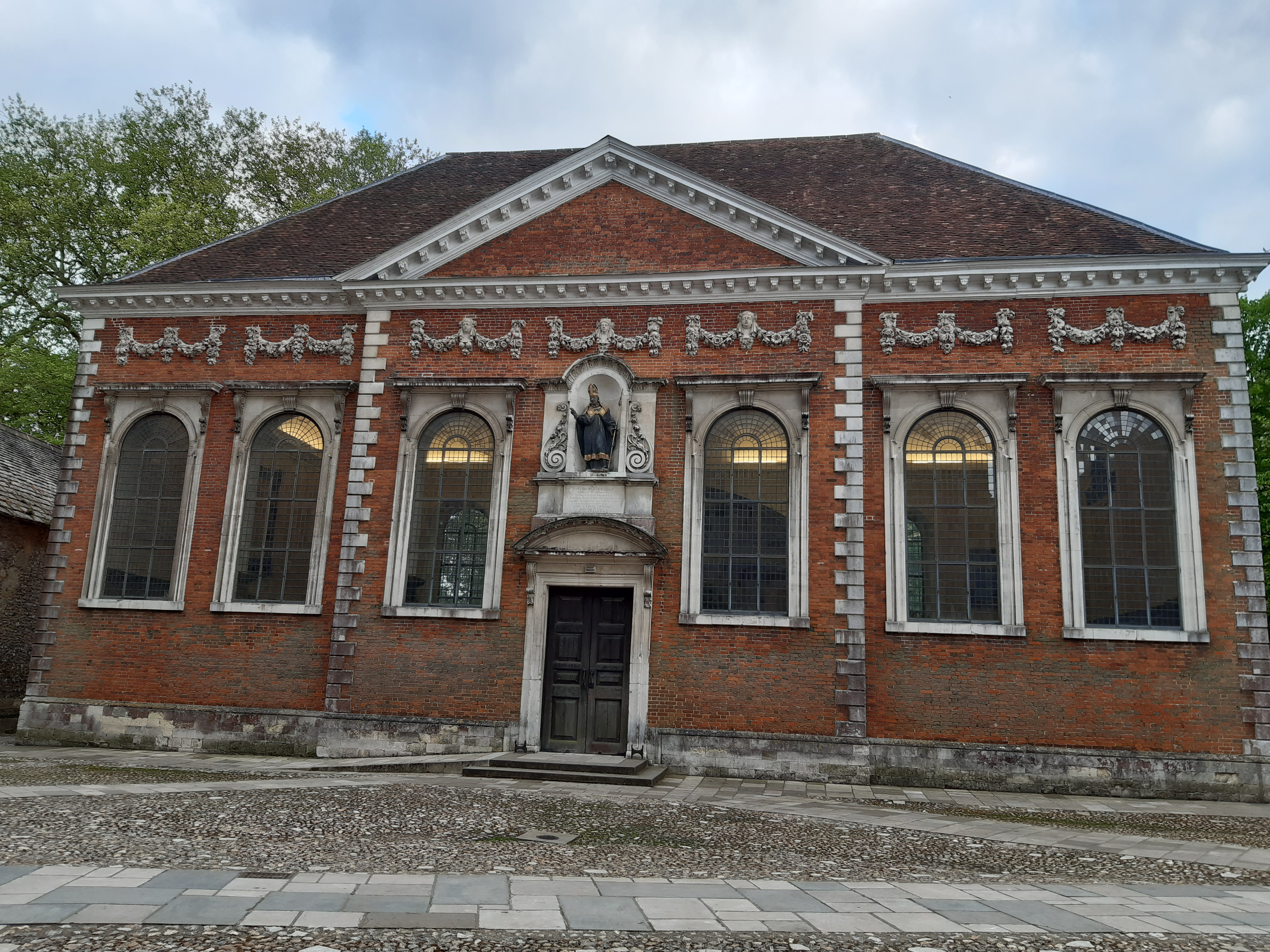
School in Wren style, 1683–1687

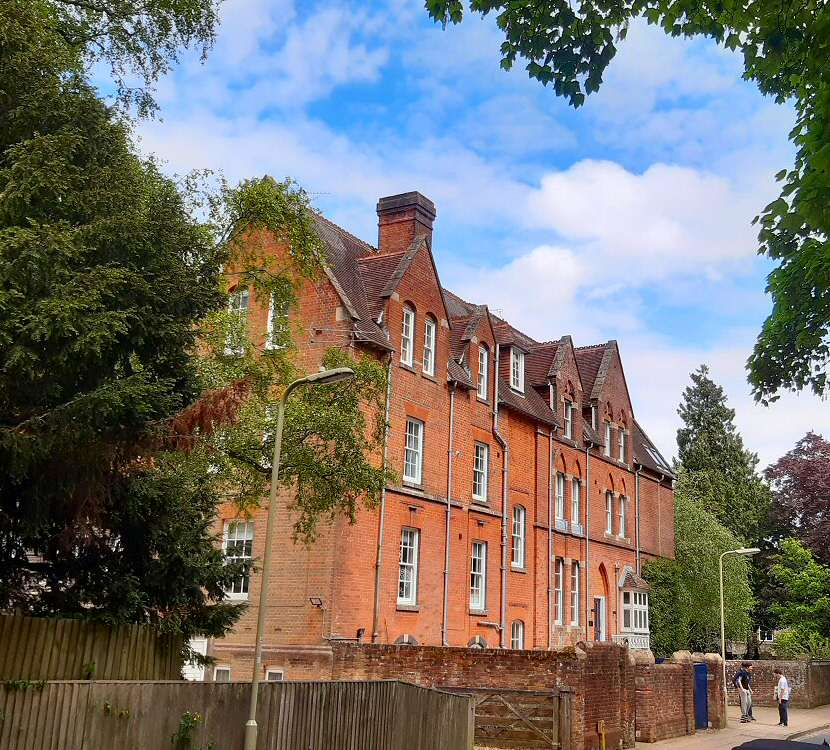
Sergeant's House by G. E. Street, 1869

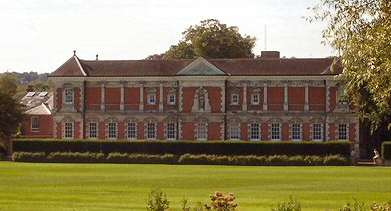
Science School by Henry Hill, 1904

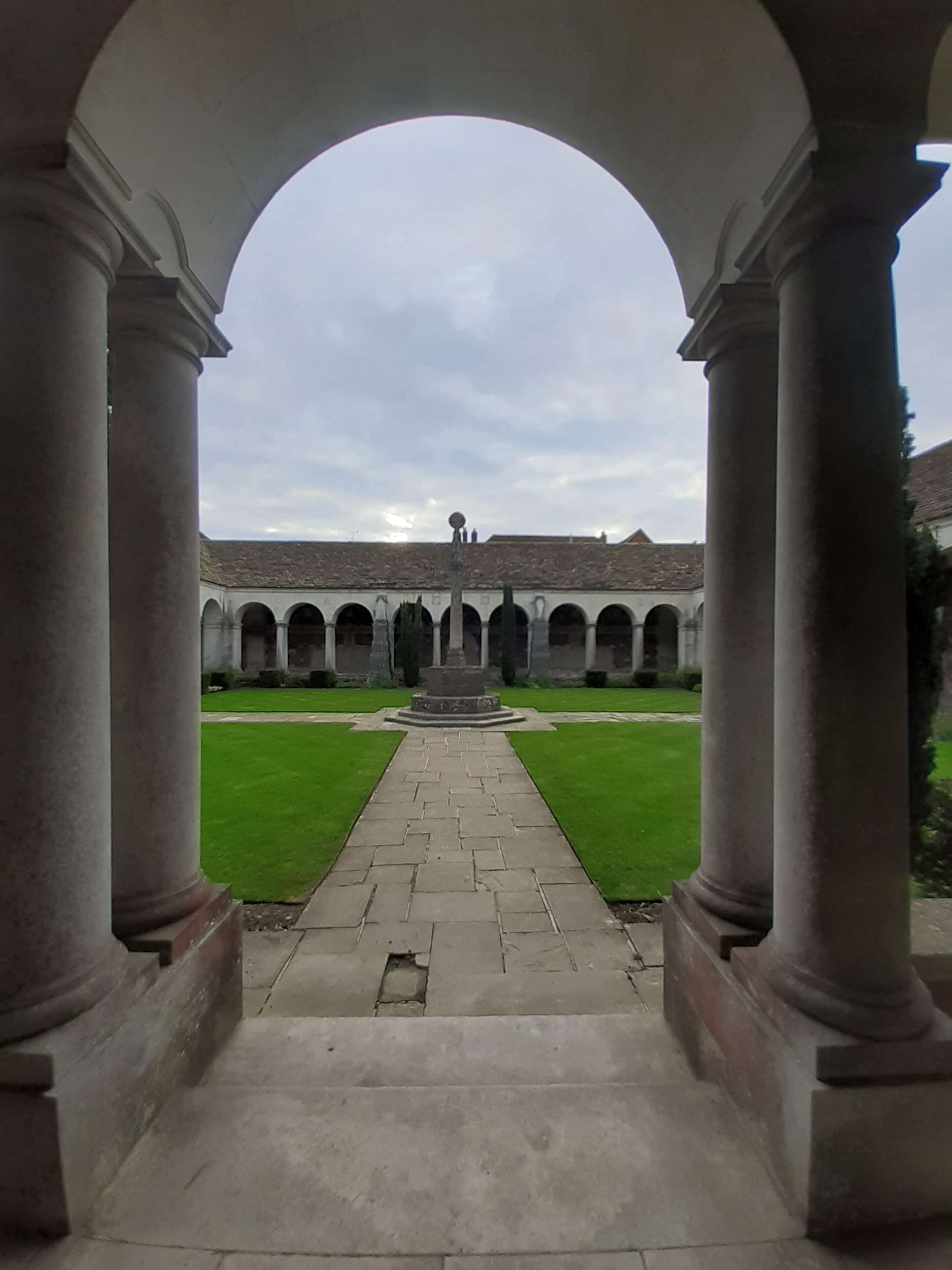
War Cloister by Herbert Baker, 1924

== Accommodation ==
=== College ===
The seventy scholars live in the original buildings, known as "College". The scholars are known as "Collegemen", and the schoolmaster in charge of them is called the Master in College. Collegemen wear black gowns, following the founding traditions of the school. Collegemen enjoy certain privileges compared to the Commoners, such as quick access to the campus, having open fires, and being allowed to walk across Meads, the walled sports field outside School.

=== Boarding houses ===
Every boarding pupil at Winchester, apart from the Scholars, lives in a boarding house, chosen or allocated when applying to Winchester. It is here that he studies, eats and sleeps. Each house is presided over by a housemaster (who takes on the role in addition to teaching duties), assisted by house tutors. Houses compete against each other in school sports. Each house has an official name, usually based on the family name of the first housemaster, which is used mainly as a postal address. Each house other than College also has an informal name, usually based on the name or nickname of an early housemaster. Each house also has a letter, in the order of their founding, to act as an abbreviation. A member of a house is described by the informal name of the house with "-ite" suffixed, as "a Furleyite", "a Toyeite", "a Cookite" and so on.

In September 2026, the school's first girls' boarding house, St Cross, opened. Construction of a second boarding house for girls, St Catherine, was completed in 2026.

== Academic ==
=== Admission ===
Winchester is held to be one of the most prestigious schools in the world. It has its own entrance examination, and does not use Common Entrance like other major public schools. Those wishing to enter a Commoner House make their arrangements with the relevant housemaster some two years before sitting the exam, usually sitting a test set by the housemaster and an interview. Those applying to College do not take the normal entrance examination but instead sit a separate, harder, exam called "Election": successful candidates may obtain, according to their performance, a scholarship, an exhibition or a Headmaster's nomination to join a Commoner House. Admission to College was historically coupled to remission of fees, but this has ceased; instead, means-tested bursaries ranging from 5% to 100% of the school fee are provided, according to need. From 2022, Winchester admitted girls into the 6th form (year 12) as day pupils, with girls boarding from 2026. For 2023/24, the fee is £49,152 per annum (£16,384 per term) for boarding pupils and £36,369 per annum (£12,123 per term) for day pupils.

=== Structure ===
In addition to normal lessons, all boys throughout the school are required to attend a class called Division (known as "Div") which explores parts of history, literature, and politics that do not lead to external examinations; its purpose is to ensure a broad education.

From year 9, pupils study for at least nine GCSE and IGCSEs. Every pupil studies English, mathematics, Latin, French or German, and at least two sciences at this level, as well as "Div". Pupils then study three A-levels, "Div", and an Extended Project Qualification.

=== Results ===
Winchester College is particularly known for its academic rigour. In 2023 at A-Level, 79.6% of student results were graded A*-A, with 42.4% at A*. At GCSE, 88.4% of results were graded 7 or higher, with 73.1% of grades being 8 or 9, and 50.5% of all grades achieving the top grade of 9. In the same year, 17% of pupils secured places at Oxbridge, while notable US destinations included Harvard University, Columbia University, the University of Pennsylvania, and the University Of Chicago. Between 2010 and 2018, an average of 33% of leavers obtained places at Oxford or Cambridge.

== Activities ==
=== Sport ===
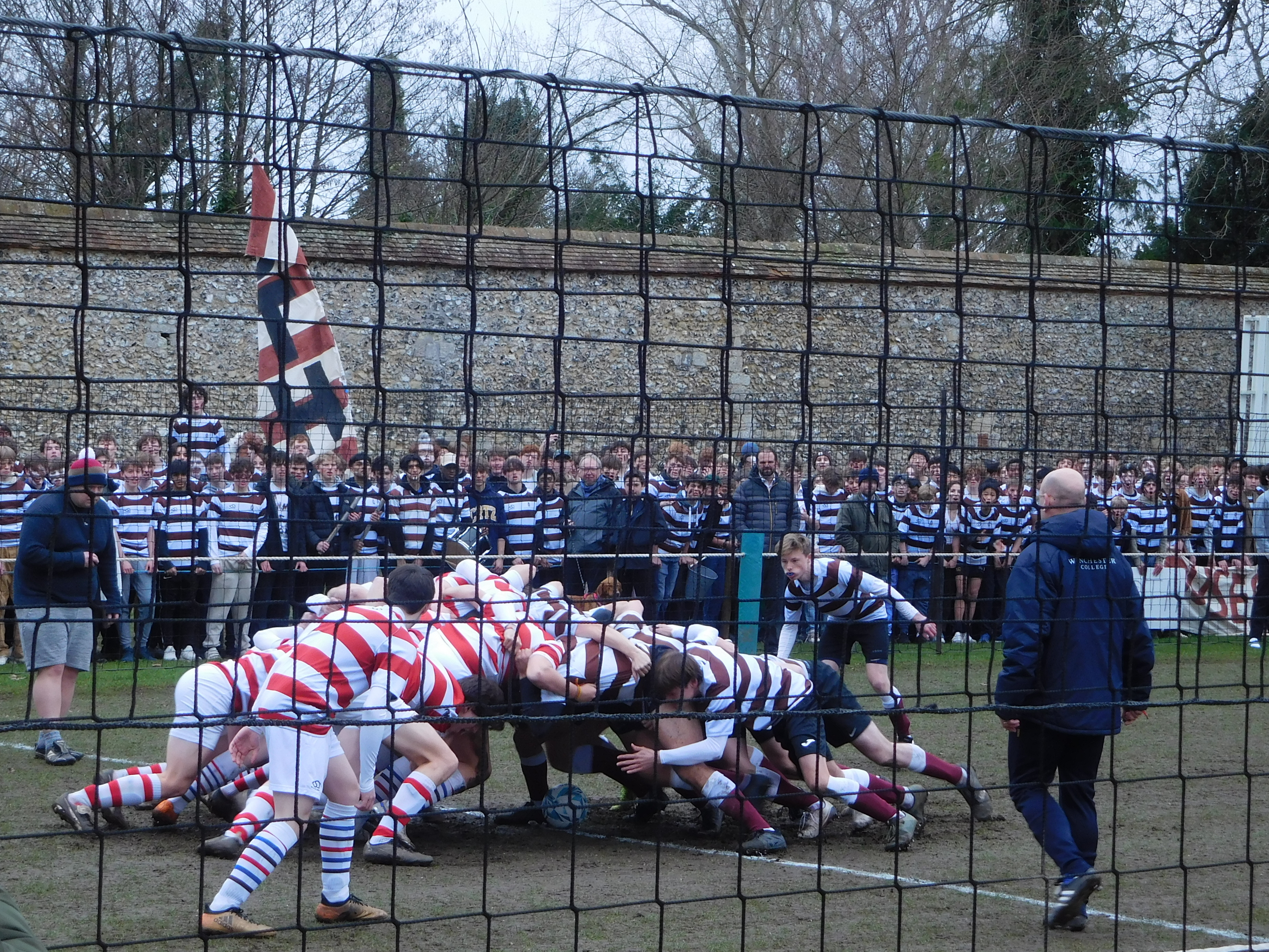
Winchester College football: a "hot" between OTH (brown and white) and Commoners (red and white) on Meads in 2023

Winchester College has its own game, Winchester College football (also known as "Win: Co: Fo:" or "Winkies"), played only at Winchester. It is played in the spring term with a competition between the school's houses; it is largely managed by the boys.

A distinctive Winchester version of fives resembles Rugby fives but with a buttress on the court. The buttress enables a skilful player to cause the ball to ricochet in an unexpected direction.

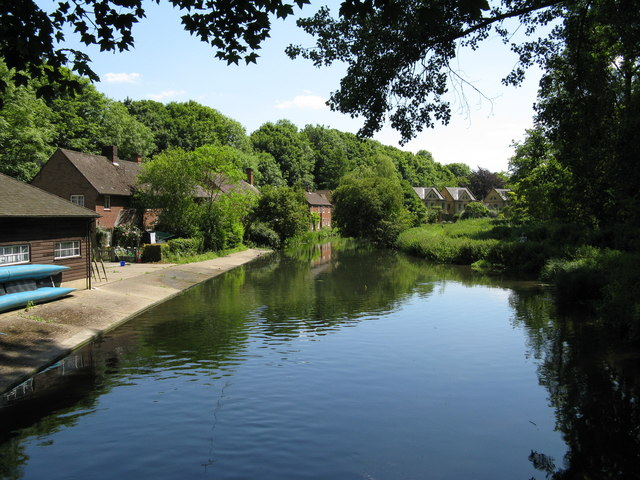
Winchester College Boat Club, on the River Itchen

The school has an active rowing club called the Winchester College Boat Club which is based on the River Itchen. The club is affiliated to British Rowing (boat code WIN) and was twice winner of the Princess Elizabeth Challenge Cup (in 1949 and 1954) at the Henley Royal Regatta.

Rivalry — particularly sporting — between Winchester College and Eton College has existed for centuries.

=== Combined Cadet Force ===
Pupils of the school in their third year are currently required to serve in the college's Combined Cadet Force.

The organisation was founded in 1860 as "The Winchester College Rifle Volunteer Corps" by various boys in their top year as a result of the perceived threat of Napoleon III after the Orsini plot, and remained entirely autonomous until it was taken over by the Second Master in 1868. It was enrolled as a Cadet Corps in the 1st Hampshire Volunteer Battalion. In 1908, the Officer Training Corps was established, and by 1914, through the request of the War Office that Senior Cadets be given appropriate training for the war effort, almost every student became involved in the Corps, though it was never explicitly compulsory. In the Second World War, it was renamed as "The Junior Training Corps", though its function was still to prepare boys for Officer responsibilities. Montgomery remarked on inspecting the Corps in 1946 that there was "latent leadership in all ranks". In 1948, the "Junior Training Corps" became known as the "Combined Cadet Force" (CCF) which incorporated RAF and RN sections. In 1963, "Alternative Service Activities" were introduced for boys who did not want to join the CCF. Pupils were made eligible to opt out of the CCF at the end of their second year after starting at the beginning of the year: this is still the school's policy.

=== Music ===
Winchester offers extensive opportunities for musical development, with two-thirds of pupils playing at least one instrument. The school has a music school and numerous practice rooms, and a variety of choirs, ensembles, and orchestras. The chapel choir has existed since the school's foundation. Music and choral scholarships fund free tuition for candidates proficient in multiple instruments at grade 6 level or above.

== Traditions ==
=== The Trusty Servant: the school mascot ===
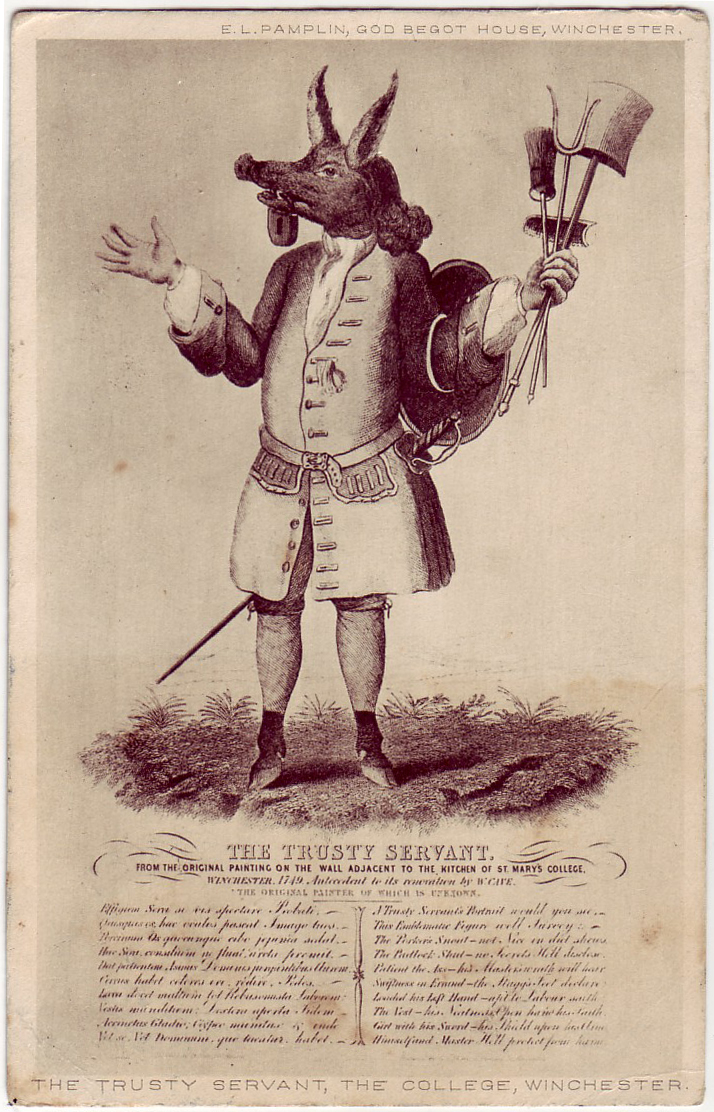
The Trusty Servant: 19th-century print

The Trusty Servant is an emblematic figure in a painting at Winchester College, that serves as the school's unofficial mascot and the name of its alumni magazine. A painting of The Trusty Servant and accompanying verses both devised by the poet John Hoskins in 1579 hangs outside the college kitchen. The current version was painted by William Cave the Younger in 1809. The painting depicts a mythical creature with the body of a man, the head of a pig, with its snout closed with a padlock, the ears of an ass, the feet of a stag, and tools in his left hand. The verses are on the virtues that pupils of the college were supposed to have. The college arms are shown in the background of the painting.

=== Notions: the school language ===
A notion is a specialised term peculiar to Winchester College. The word notion is also used to describe traditions unique to the school. An example of a notion is "toytime", meaning homework, from the notion "toys", a wooden cubicle that serves as a pupil's workspace in a communal room, known as "mugging hall" in Commoner Houses or a "chamber" in College.

=== Manners makyth man: the school motto ===
Arms of school and founder

Since the foundation, Winchester College has had numerous words and phrases directly associated with it, including its motto, its graces, and a prayer. A grace is read before and after every lunch and formal meal in College Hall. Two separate graces are traditionally sung during Election, the scholarship process.

Manners makyth man
– Motto of Winchester College, New College, Oxford, and the founder of the two colleges, William of Wykeham

The Latin grace before meals in College goes:

Latin grace

Benedic nobis, Domine Deus,
Atque iis donis tuis,
Quae de tua largitate
Sumus Sumpturi,
Per Jesum Christum, Dominum nostrum. Amen.

English translation

Bless us, Lord God,
And those Thy gifts,
Of which through Thy bounty
We are about to partake,
Through Jesus Christ, our Lord. Amen.

The Latin grace after meals in College goes:

Latin grace

Agimus tibi gratias,
Omnipotens Deus,
Pro his et universis donis tuis,
Quae de tua largitate
Accepimus,
Qui vivis et regnas,
Et es Deus,
In saecula saeculorum. Amen.

English translation

We return thanks to Thee,
Almighty God,
For these and all Thy gifts,
Which through Thy bounty
We have received
Who livest and reigneth,
And art God,
World without end. Amen.

=== Domum: the school song ===
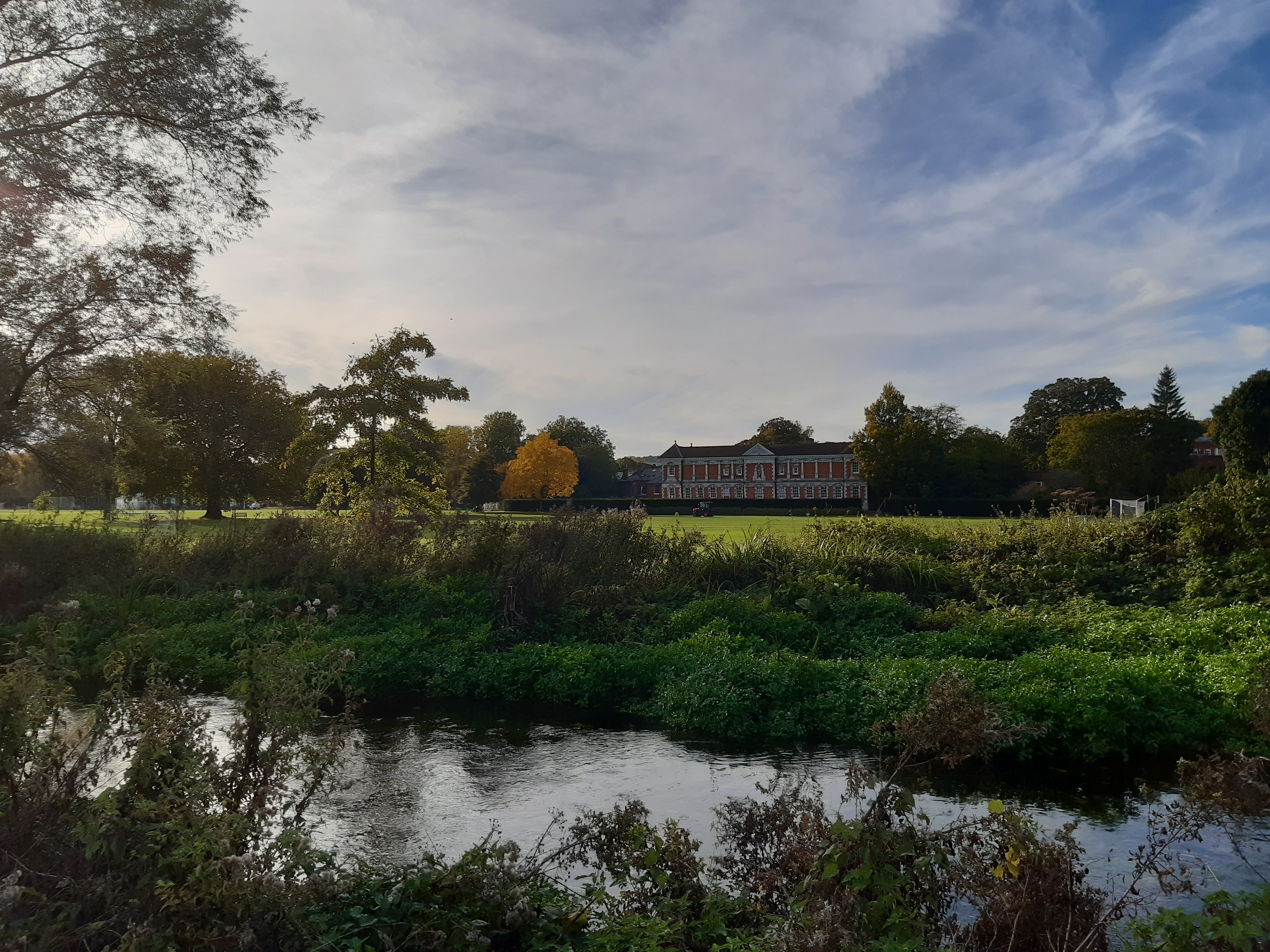
It is said that the pupil who wrote "Domum" threw himself into the River Itchen, which runs through the school grounds.

The school song is entitled "Domum" and is sung at the end of the summer term, known as Cloister Time. The origin of the song is unknown; it was described as "an old tradition" in the 1773 History and Antiquities of Winchester. The traditional tune was composed by John Reading. A new tune, by Malcolm Archer, was officially adopted by the school in about 2007.

According to legend, the text was written in the 17th century by a pupil who was confined for misconduct during the Whitsun holidays. (In one account, he was tied to a pillar.) It is said that he carved the words on the bark of a tree, which was thereafter called "Domum Tree", and cast himself into Logie (the river running through the school grounds). There is still a "Domum Cottage" in that area. The author of the text apparently wrongly treated domum as a neuter noun.

A "Domum Dinner" is held at the end of the summer term for leavers. It was formerly restricted to those former scholars of Winchester who were also scholars of New College, and distinguished guests. Until the reforms of the 19th century, there were three successive Election Dinners held during Election Week, culminating in a Domum Ball. Originally these festivities occurred around Whitsun, as suggested by references in the song to early summer such as "See the year, the meadow, smiling" and "Now the swallow seeks her dwelling".

== Influence ==
Winchester's approach to education was influential on later schools. It was unusual in the medieval period in giving education to boys aged 12–18, as universities would accept students within this age range. The age range, the double foundation with New College, Oxford, and the approach to discipline formed the model for Eton College and King's College, Cambridge, some 50 years later.

Pupils of the school have appeared in many works of fiction: the school itself rather less often. The figure of Sir Humphrey Appleby in the TV series Yes Minister is among the best-known Old Wykehamists in fiction.

As with other prominent public schools, a locomotive of the Southern Railway V Class was named after Winchester College. The second of the class, No. 901 Winchester was constructed by Southern at the nearby Eastleigh Works; it entered service in 1930.

== Headmasters ==
The headmasters of Winchester College from the 14th century onwards are:

- 1373 Richard Herton
- 1388 John Melton
- 1394 Thomas Romsey
- 1407 John Pole
- 1414 Thomas Romsey
- 1418 Richard Darcy
- 1424 Thomas Alwyn
- 1430 William Waynflete
- 1441 Thomas Alwyn
- 1444 William Yve
- 1454 John Barnard
- 1459 John Grene
- 1465 Clement Smyth
- 1467 Richard Dene
- 1484 John Rede
- 1490 Robert Festham
- 1495 William Horman
- 1501 John Farlyngton
- 1507 Edward More
- 1515 Thomas Erlisman
- 1525 John Twychener
- 1531 Richard Twychener
- 1535 John White
- 1542 Thomas Bayly
- 1547 William Everard
- 1553 Thomas Hyde
- 1561 Christopher Johnson
- 1572 Thomas Bilson
- 1579 Hugh Lloyd
- 1588 John Harmar
- 1596 Benjamin Heydon
- 1602 Nicholas Love
- 1613 Hugh Robinson
- 1627 Edward Stanley
- 1642 John Pottinger
- 1653 William Burt
- 1658 Henry Beeston
- 1679 William Harris
- 1700 Thomas Cheyney
- 1724 John Burton
- 1766 Joseph Warton
- 1793 William Stanley Goddard
- 1810 Henry Dison Gabell
- 1824 David Williams
- 1836 George Moberly
- 1867 George Ridding
- 1884 William Andrewes Fearon
- 1901 Hubert Murray Burge
- 1911 Montague John Rendall
- 1924 Alwyn Terrell Petre Williams
- 1934 Spencer Leeson
- 1946 Walter Fraser Oakeshott
- 1954 Henry Desmond Pritchard Lee
- 1968 John Leonard Thorn
- 1985 James Paley Sabben-Clare
- 2000 Nicholas Tate
- 2003 Thomas Richard Cookson
- 2005 Ralph Douglas Townsend
- 2016 Timothy Roderick Hands
- 2023 Elizabeth Stone
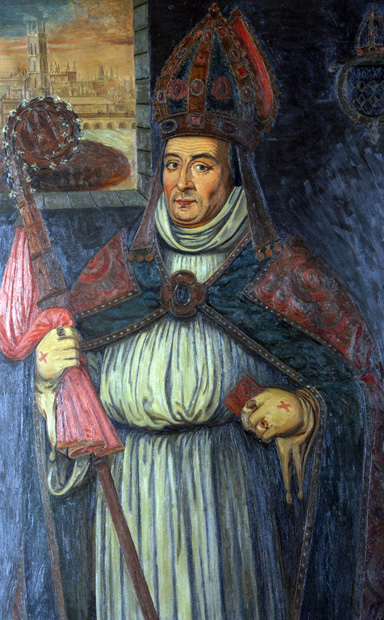
William Waynflete as bishop, c. 1470

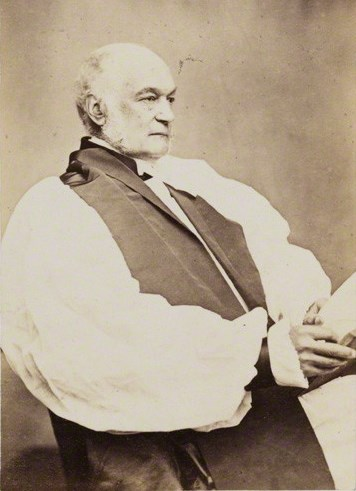
George Moberly, 1870

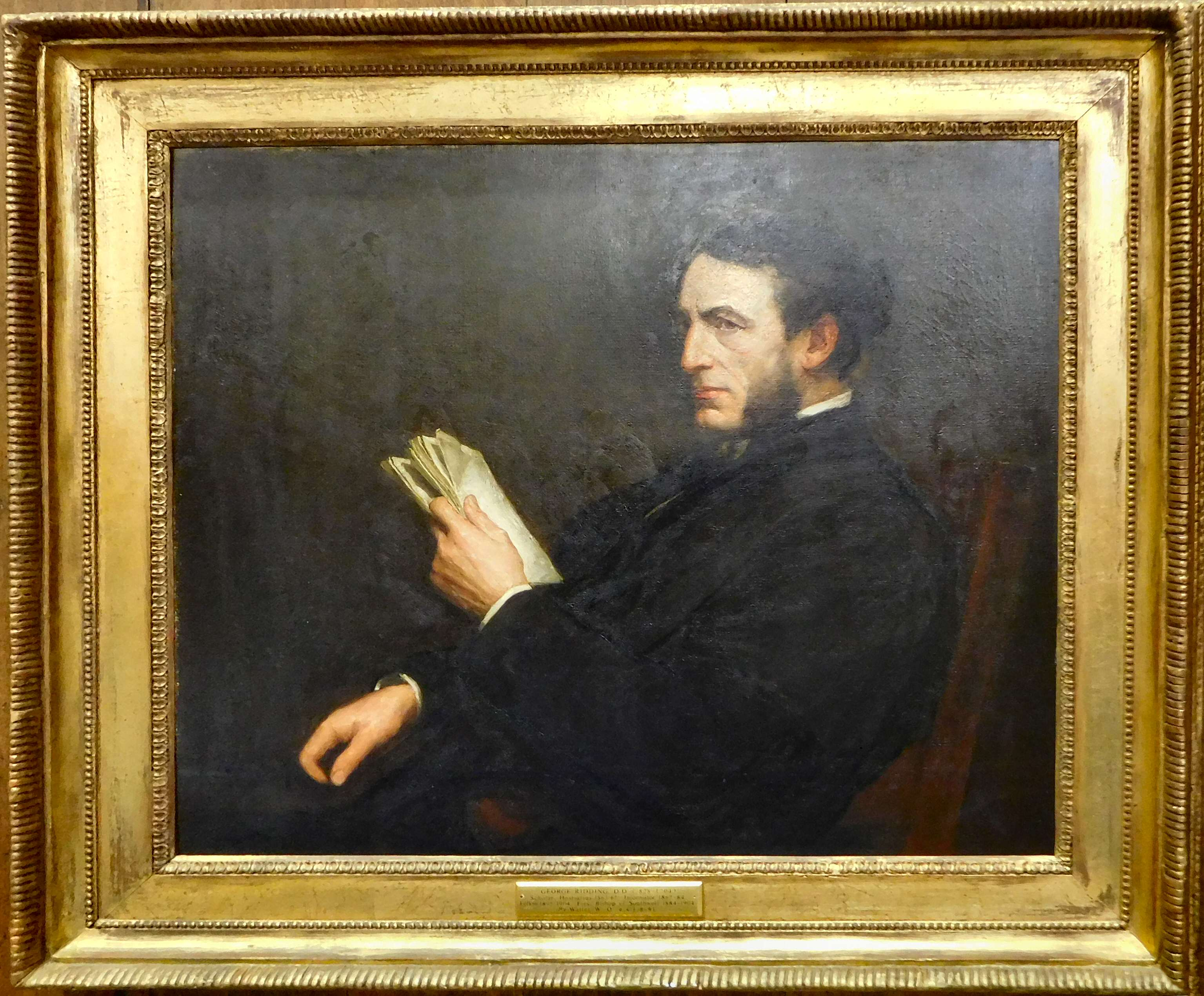
George Ridding, 1879,
by Walter William Ouless

== Notable former pupils ==
Current pupils of Winchester College are known as Wykehamists, in memory of the school's founder, William of Wykeham; former pupils are known as Old Wykehamists, or amongst themselves as Old Woks. Fictional Old Wykehamists appear in over 50 novels, starting with Tobias Smollett's eponymous Peregrine Pickle in 1751.

== Controversies ==
In 1872, under the headmaster George Ridding, "tunding", beatings given by a prefect (a senior pupil), using a ground-ash across the shoulders, were still permitted. The matter became a national scandal, known as "the Tunding Row", when "an overzealous Senior Commoner Prefect" beat a pupil for refusing to attend a notions test. Ridding made matters worse by trying to defend the action. He eventually limited the prefects' power to beat, and forbade notions tests as a "disgraceful innovation".

In the 1970s and 80s, the college permitted a Christian Forum – later described as "cult-like" – to operate on college grounds, giving John Smyth, a prominent barrister with no formal connection to the school, access to pupils. He carried out sadomasochistic abuse on several of them at his nearby house in Morestead. Smyth was a leader of the evangelical Christian Iwerne camps, where abuse also took place. He was assisted in this by former Winchester pupil Simon Doggart. The college and the Iwerne Trust became aware of these allegations in 1982, but neither reported them to the police. Smyth was warned off: he moved to Zimbabwe and then South Africa, where abuse continued. An independent review, commissioned by the college, was published in January 2022, alongside the Makin Review by the Church of England and a review by the Titus Trust (which succeeded the Iwerne Trust).

In 2005, Winchester College was one of fifty of the country's leading independent schools found guilty of running an unlawful price-fixing cartel by the Office of Fair Trading. As a penalty, the schools paid for a trust fund to benefit the affected pupils. Winchester College, like Eton, received a fifty per cent reduction in its penalty in return for its full cooperation.

In 2017 Winchester College suspended its Head of Art History for providing students with information about questions on an upcoming public exam. The headmaster confirmed that the school had treated the matter "very seriously" and that no boy was responsible for the "exam irregularity". The information was widely distributed, resulting in their papers being disallowed.

== See also ==
- List of the oldest schools in the United Kingdom
