= James Sabben-Clare =

Headmaster of Winchester College

- Born: 9 September 1941
- Died: 8 March 2017 (aged 75)
- Occupation: Schoolmaster
- Known for: Headmaster of Winchester College

James Sabben-Clare (9 September 1941 – 8 March 2017) was headmaster of Winchester College. He had been educated at the school and spent most of his career on the teaching staff there, serving as head from 1985 to his retirement in 2000. He has been described as "one of the most gifted schoolmasters of his generation". He was chairman of the Headmasters' Conference in 1999.

== Early life ==
James Sabben-Clare was the son of Ernest Sabben-Clare. Ernest's father, brought up by a single mother, had won a free education at Winchester College, and became the headmaster of Bishop Wordsworth's School, Salisbury and then of Leeds Grammar School. James too was educated at Winchester College, winning the top scholarship to gain a fully-funded place there in 1954. He won another scholarship to Winchester College's sister foundation, New College, Oxford. At the University of Oxford he gained a double first class degree in mods and greats, a humanities course centred on Latin and Greek.

== Career ==
Election to a Winchester scholarship could once guarantee a subsequent scholarship to New College, a benefice, and security for life; accordingly Wykeham made thorough and careful provision for the manner in which the boys were to be chosen for his school: even the number of horses to be used by the examiners coming from Oxford was considered. However the most important point, the nature of the examination itself, was left regrettably vague. Whereas scholars for New College were to be elected in order of merit, the places at Winchester were simply to be assigned to any who seemed on examination to be 'fit and suitable'. From the earliest days of the school's history this laid the system open to the abuse of nomination and patronage.

— James Sabben-Clare, Winchester College: After 600 Years, 1382–1982, 1981. From Chapter IV: The Pursuit of Learning

Sabben-Clare began his career as a schoolmaster at Marlborough College in Wiltshire for four years, then spending a year as a visiting fellow of All Souls College, Oxford. From there he moved to Winchester College in 1968, where he became successively head of classics in 1969, second master (deputy head) in 1979, and in 1985 headmaster, a post he held until his retirement from teaching in 2000. Another headmaster of Winchester College, Tommy Cookson, wrote in The Daily Telegraph that he was "one of the most gifted schoolmasters of his generation", stating that "He ran the school with a light touch. He overcame a childhood stammer to "sh[i]ne as a classical scholar, author, actor, sportsman, carpenter and cabaret artiste". Although unflappably in control, he recognised the quality, power and independent-mindedness of his staff and allowed them free range." During his time there he abolished corporal punishment and, in a residential school which had taught boys for 600 years, appointed several women to the school's staff.

In 1999, he became chairman of the Headmasters' Conference. Its inspectors stated that under his headship the school's standards were "consistently at the highest level", assisted by the "intellectual rapport which exists between teachers and pupils". The Guardian reported that Sabben-Clare "caused controversy" by telling the conference that A-Levels had become easier and "failed to stretch the brightest pupils." To the news that Winchester College was once again top of the A-level league table, Sabben-Clare commented that Wykehamists were getting more grade As, but that did not mean they were any better than school-leavers of 20 years earlier.

== Other duties ==
Sabben-Clare was appointed as a governor of various schools during his career at Winchester; after his retirement he continued to serve as a governor of the British School of Paris and Oundle School. He was on the steering committee that created the Prince of Wales's Teaching Institute; it ran summer schools to inspire teachers in their subjects. He worked on the project for 15 years. While in retirement at Corfe Castle in Dorset he assisted the Dorset Historic Churches Trust with their annual reports.

== Family life ==
He and his wife Mary had a son who has become a merchant banker, and a daughter who has become a commercial barrister.

== Books ==
- 1971: Caesar and Roman Politics 60–50BC: Source Material in Translation. Oxford University Press.
- 1976: Fables from Aesop (translation). Winchester College.
- 1981: Winchester College: After 600 Years, 1382–1982. Paul Cave Publications.
- 1991: The Culture of Athens. London Association of Classical Teachers.
- 1995: Between Friends: A Comedy in Three Acts (with Archie Menzies). S. French.
- 2010: All From the Same Place: Portraits of Twenty-five Remarkable Old Wykehamists (with Malcolm Burr). Winchester College Society.
