= Ridding =

Ridding is a surname, and may refer to:

- Charles Ridding (1825–1905), English cricketer
- C. M. Ridding (1862–1941), English scholar of Sanskrit and Pali
- Ernest Ridding 1927–2001), Australian eccentric
- Bill Ridding (1911–1981), English football player and manager
- George Ridding (1828–1904), English headmaster and bishop
- Lady Laura Ridding (1849–1939), British biographer, suffragist and philanthropist
- William Ridding (cricketer) (1830–1900), English cricketer

== See also ==
- Riddings, village in Derbyshire, England.
