= Maureen Emerson (writer) =

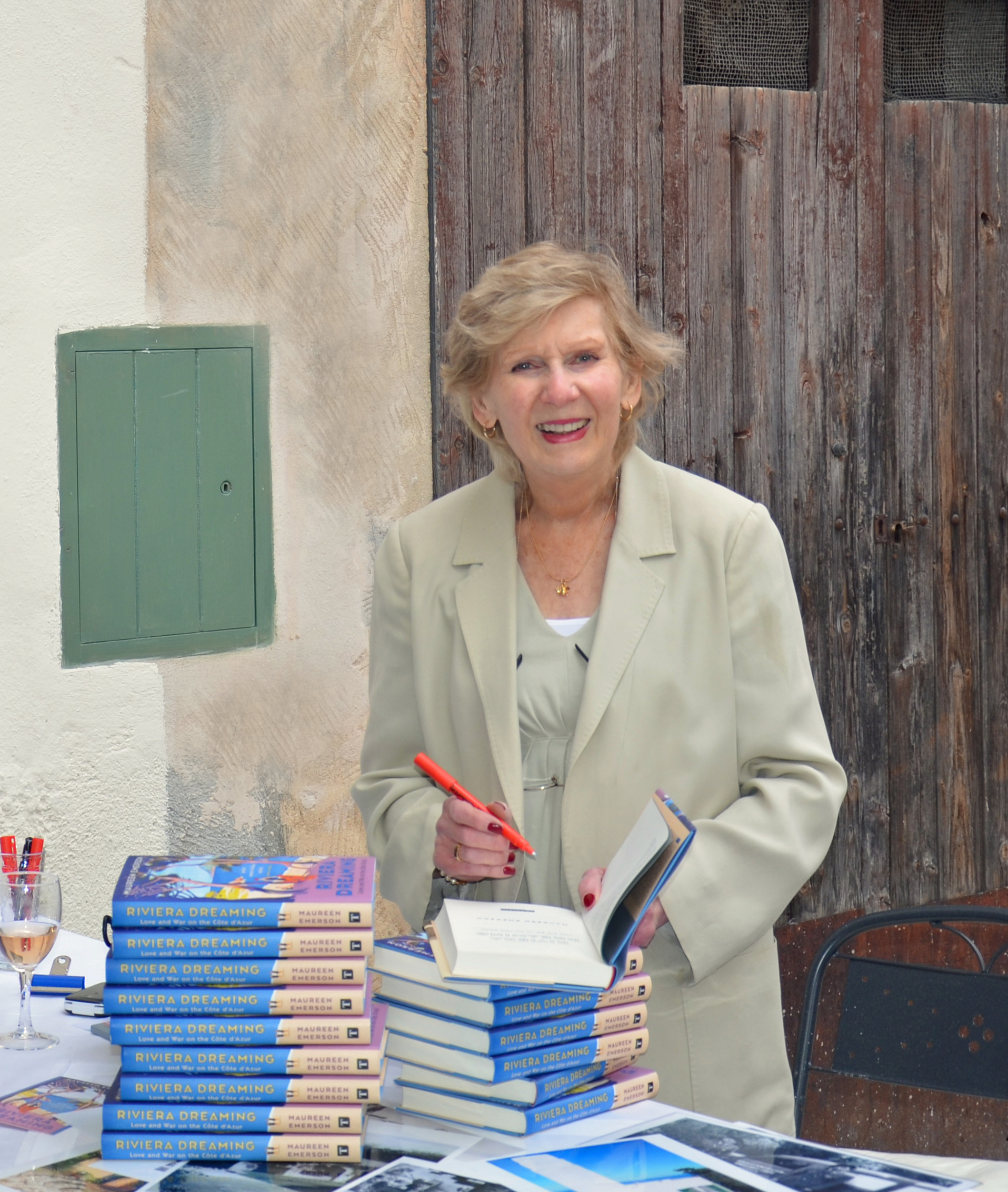
- Born: Somerset, England.
- Education: Convent School, Hammersmith, London.
- Occupations: 2000-present (as a writer). 1977-2000 Local representative in the television festivals held in Monaco and Cannes, France for CBS and then NBC.
- Years active: 2000-present (as a writer).
- Era: 20th & 21st Centuries
- Notable work: 'Escape to Provence' published 2008. 'Riviera Dreaming' published 2018.
- Website: www.rivieradreaming.co.uk

Maureen Emerson is a non-fiction writer with a particular interest in the history of the French Riviera during the interwar period. Whilst living near Valbonne, Provence in France for over 20 years Maureen researched the life of ex-pats on the Riviera in the 1920's and 1930's and how the second world war impacted their lives. She has written two books, Riviera Dreaming – Love and War on the Côte d’Azur, and Escape to Provence plus numerous published articles on the Riviera.

== Biography ==
Maureen Emerson's parents grew up in Dublin (her mother was a model along with Maureen Fitzsimmons, later Maureen O'Hara) and they ran away to get married. She was born in a cottage in a Somerset village at the outbreak of war. In 1940 her father joined the RAF and, together with her mother, she returned to Dublin where she spent an idyllic six years. After the war ended, in 1946, the three left for a new life in England and a war torn London.

Maureen attended a traditional convent school in Hammersmith followed by secretarial college in Regent Street which led to employment in the post room of J. Arthur Rank Productions and other jobs. Her funds, however, bought her a ticket to a very post-war Paris where a friend was working in a parfumerie in the Rue Scribe. “How elegant were the elderly hard-faced manageresses in their perfectly cared-for black suits, Oh, the thrill of it all!"

Back in London, she returned to temporary work, before having an amazing stroke of luck. She was introduced to a female paediatrician who, although single, had adopted three children and needed an au pair. The extended family spent part of the year in Paris and at an ancient farmhouse in Normandy. The parents were rich, artistic, new Proust and been friends with the artist Berthe Morisot. "What an introduction to France and, for this, I have never ceased to be grateful,” she recalls.

After marriage in 1961, Maureen moved with her geologist husband to Algiers. Before her marriage Maureen had already been out to visit and found a job with the US Information Service for six months. Her daughter was born a year later in the Clinique Laverne, in downtown Algiers and then it was onwards to Tunisia. After returning to the UK, and following the birth of her two sons, she moved to Beirut for two years, followed by Dallas for two years and then Singapore.

== Provence ==
In 1977 Maureen's husband was asked to move to Provence. Having been born in Bordeaux there was no question about accepting the posting and Maureen and her family settled close to the village of Valbonne. During this time, Maureen worked as a local representative in the television festivals held in Monaco and Cannes. For CBS, she “had the great fun” organising large receptions at the Musée Massena in Nice and the Château de la Napoule. Then on to NBC, which had a more serious, less flamboyant, profile.

Maureen lived in Valbonne for over 20 years. Moving back and forth between England and France, she had done voluntary work with the donated books at the old Sunny Bank Hospital in Cannes. Among them was one by an author she had not heard of. According to her, this book changed her life. "Who was Winifred Fortescue and what was this book Perfume from Provence? Did she really write six other books on Provence? I must find them, I must find the two houses she lived in, her friends and what happened to her during the war.”

== UK ==
After returning to England in 2000 Maureen settled in East Sussex but continued with her research into Winifred Fortescue and writing about France between the wars. She has produced numerous articles including, the history of the Anglo American Sunny Bank Hospital in Cannes, Resistance Heroine Hélène Vagliano, Sir John Fortescue, Spitfire Pilot Richard Hillary, Eric Dunstan (‘the man with the golden voice’), Olga Khokhlova and Tsarina Alexandra Feodorovna, (‘Russians of the Riviera’).

After years of research Maureen produced her first book, Escape to Provence - published in 2008. This is the true story of two women who, in the peace between two world wars, changed their lifestyles for themselves in a village in the South of France. An American from Philadelphia, Elisabeth Parrish Starr a respected individual of the Great War, and an Englishwoman, the author Winifred (Peggy) Fortescue, whose memoir Perfume from Provence became a best-seller of the 1930s and 1940s, both escaped to Provence for quite different reasons. Her second book is titled Riviera Dreaming – the Côte d’Azur in Love and War, published in 2018 by IB Tauris, now Bloomsbury Publishing ISBN 1788311620. Once again, following research Maureen produced a factual biography of Barry Dierks, ‘the American architect of the Riviera’ who built or remodelled around 70 architecturally acclaimed villas on the coast of the South of France in the first half of the 20th century. The story tells of the life of Barry, his partner in business and life, the Englishman Colonel Eric Sawyer, and their villas and gardens.

Maureen and her husband now reside near London where she continues to engage in her historical research into the French Riviera between the wars.

== Books ==
- Escape to Provence –The true story of Winifred (Peggy) Fortescue and Elisabeth Parish Starr.
- Riviera Dreaming – the Côte d’Azur in Love and War, A factual biography of Barry Dierks, ‘the American architect of the Riviera.’

== Articles ==
- "Riviera Dreaming Articles"
- The French Riviera - Affair of The Hotel Martinez, Cannes
- The American Riviera - James Gordon Bennett
- The Hungarian Riviera - Baroness Orczy
- Barry Dierks Villas - Illustrated
- The Riviera in Turmoil - Careless Consuls and Unbearable Boats
- The English Riviera - the story of Eric Dunstan, "The man with the golden voice"
- The French Riviera - Claude Marcus's story, Occupation to Liberation
- From Ascot to Cannes - Hélène Vagliano, Heroine of the Resistance
- From Windsor to Provence - Sir John Fortescue, Perfume from Provence
- The French Riviera - La Pausa before Chanel
- The American Riviera - La Turbie
- The English Riviera - Lord Derby, The Lost Villa Sansovino
- Occupied France - The Free French Journal
- The Russian Riviera - Olga Stepahovna Khokhlova
- Richard Hillary - World War II RAF Spitfire pilot
- The English Riviera - Sunny Bank Hospital, "Be ill in your own language"
- The Riviera of the 1920's
- The Russian Riviera - Tsarina Alexandra Feodorova
- The Scottish Riviera - Donald Caskie - Resistant Pastor
- The British Italian Riviera - W O Bentley and the Bantley Boys
- The Franco American Revolution - The Birth of America
- Tales of the Old Riviera - Somerset Maugham
