= Arthur Ridding =

English cricketer

Personal information
- Full name: Arthur Ridding
- Born: 16 January 1827; Winchester, Hampshire, England
- Died: 4 September 1876 (aged 49); Oxford, Oxfordshire, England
- Batting: Unknown
- Relatives: William Ridding (brother); Charles Ridding (brother)

Domestic team information
- Years: Team
- 1846–1850: Oxford University

Career statistics
Competition	First-class
Matches	13
Runs scored	265
Batting average	13.25
100s/50s	–/–
Top score	40
Catches/stumpings	4/–
- Source: Cricinfo, 4 April 2020

Arthur Ridding (16 January 1827 – 4 September 1876) was an English first-class cricketer, educator and librarian.

The son of The Reverend Charles Henry Ridding, who was a fellow at Winchester College, Ridding was born at Winchester in January 1827. He was educated at Winchester College, before going up to New College, Oxford in 1845, where he became a fellow in 1847. While studying at Oxford, he played first-class cricket for Oxford University, making his debut against the Marylebone Cricket Club at Oxford in 1846. He played first-class cricket for Oxford until 1850, making a total of thirteen appearances. He scored a total of 265 runs in his thirteen matches, at an average of 13.25 and a high score of 40. He was described by Baily's Monthly Magazine of Sports and Pastimes as “a very fine field and a very hard hitter”.

After graduating from Oxford, he became a commoner tutor at Winchester College from 1852 to 1859. By 1863, he was a librarian and dean at New College, posts he held until his sudden death in his room at New College in September 1876. Two of his brothers, William and Charles both played first-class cricket, while a third, George, was a headmaster of Winchester College.
