= Admiral's House, Hampstead =

Listed building in the London Borough of Camden

Admiral's House
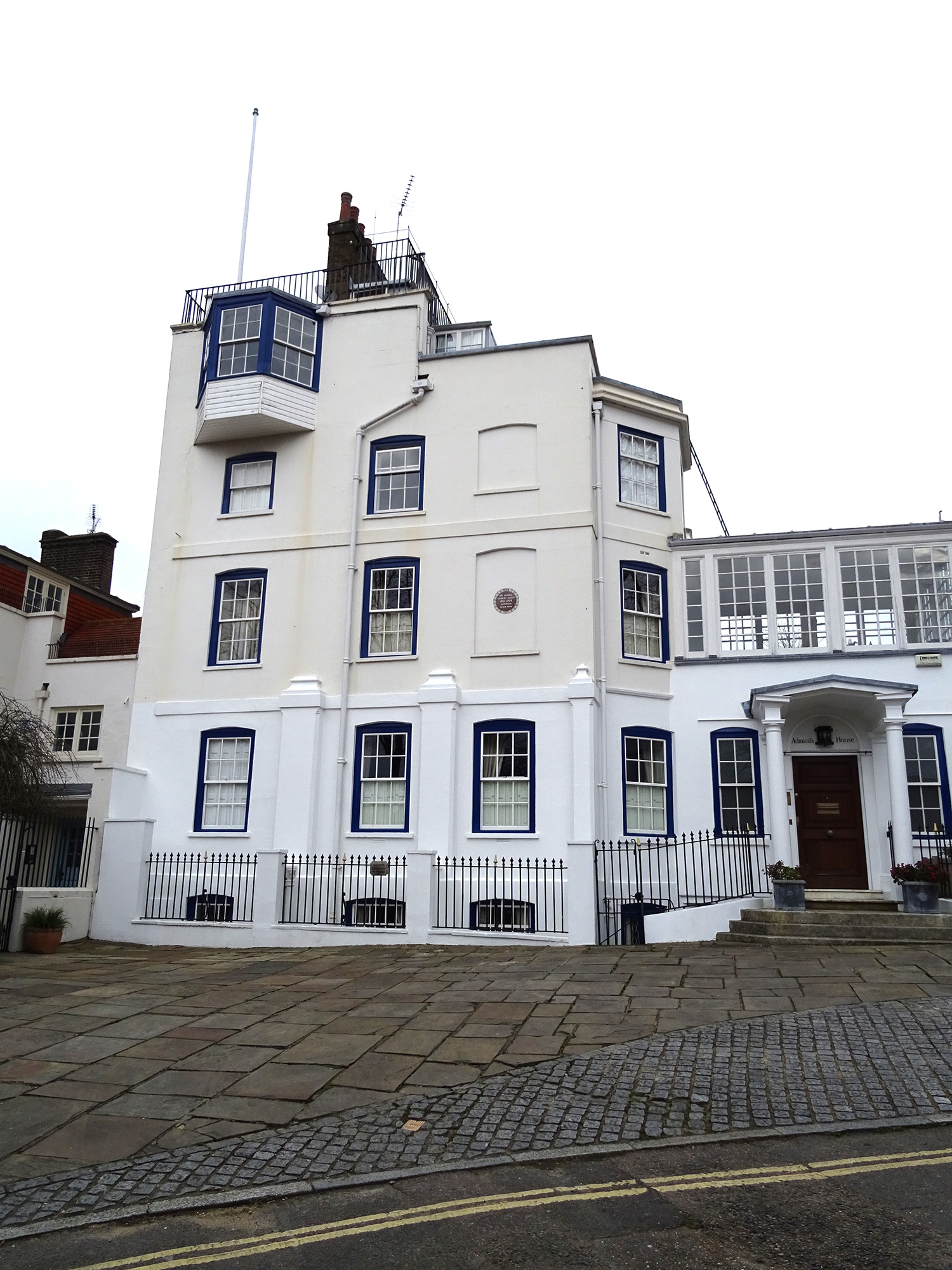
- Admiral's House in 2016
- Interactive map of the Admiral's House area
- Former names: Golden Spikes; The Grove

General information
- Status: Completed
- Type: House
- Classification: Grade II
- Location: Hampstead, London Borough of Camden, London, United Kingdom
- Coordinates: 51.5597°N 0.1801°W
- Construction started: 1700

Technical details
- Material: Stone brick

Admiral's House (originally known as Golden Spikes and later as The Grove) is a Grade II listed house in Hampstead in the London Borough of Camden. The house's name is a misnomer, as no admirals have ever lived there. The house is featured in multiple paintings by John Constable.

== History ==
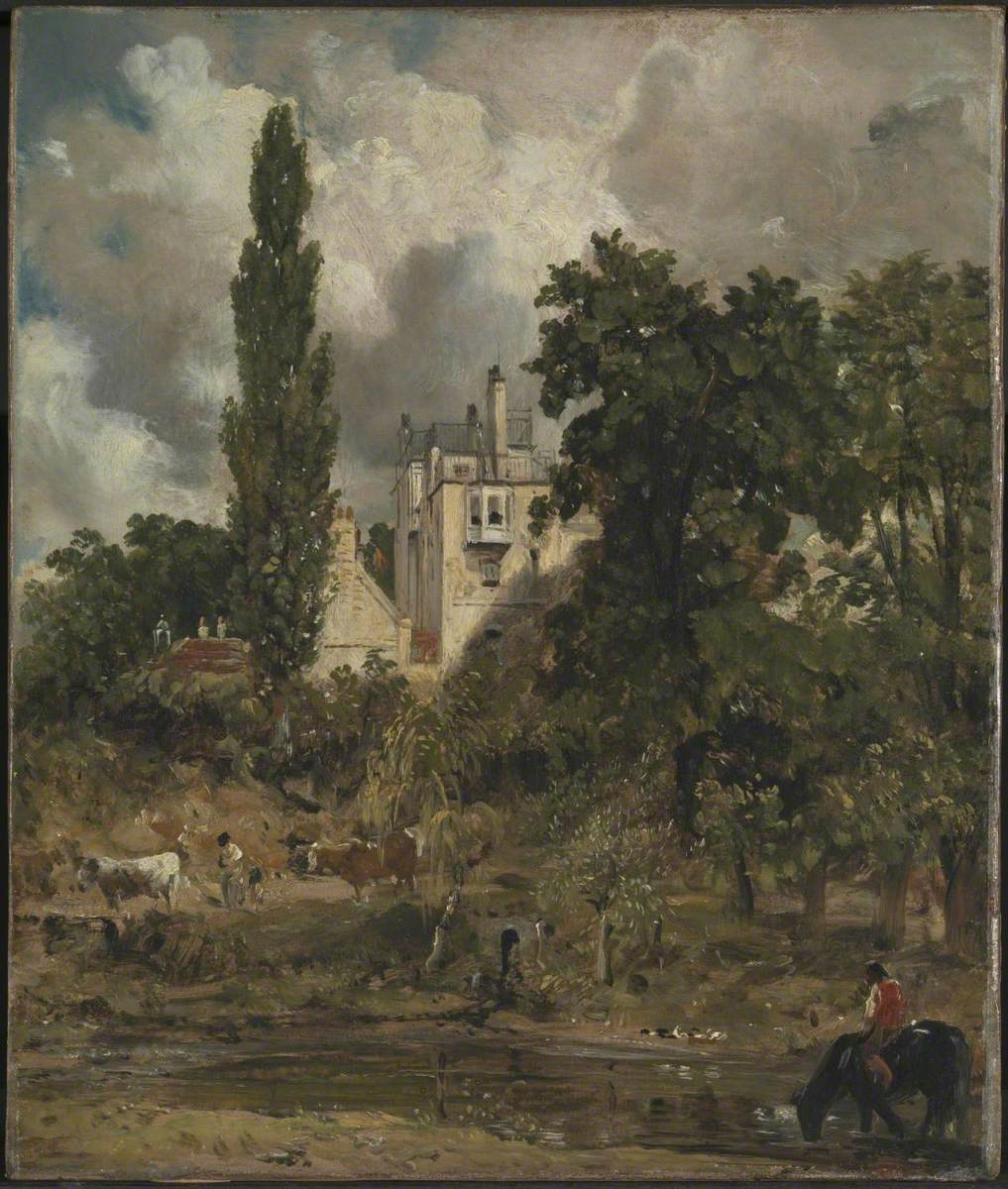
The Grove, Hampstead by John Constable, c.1822

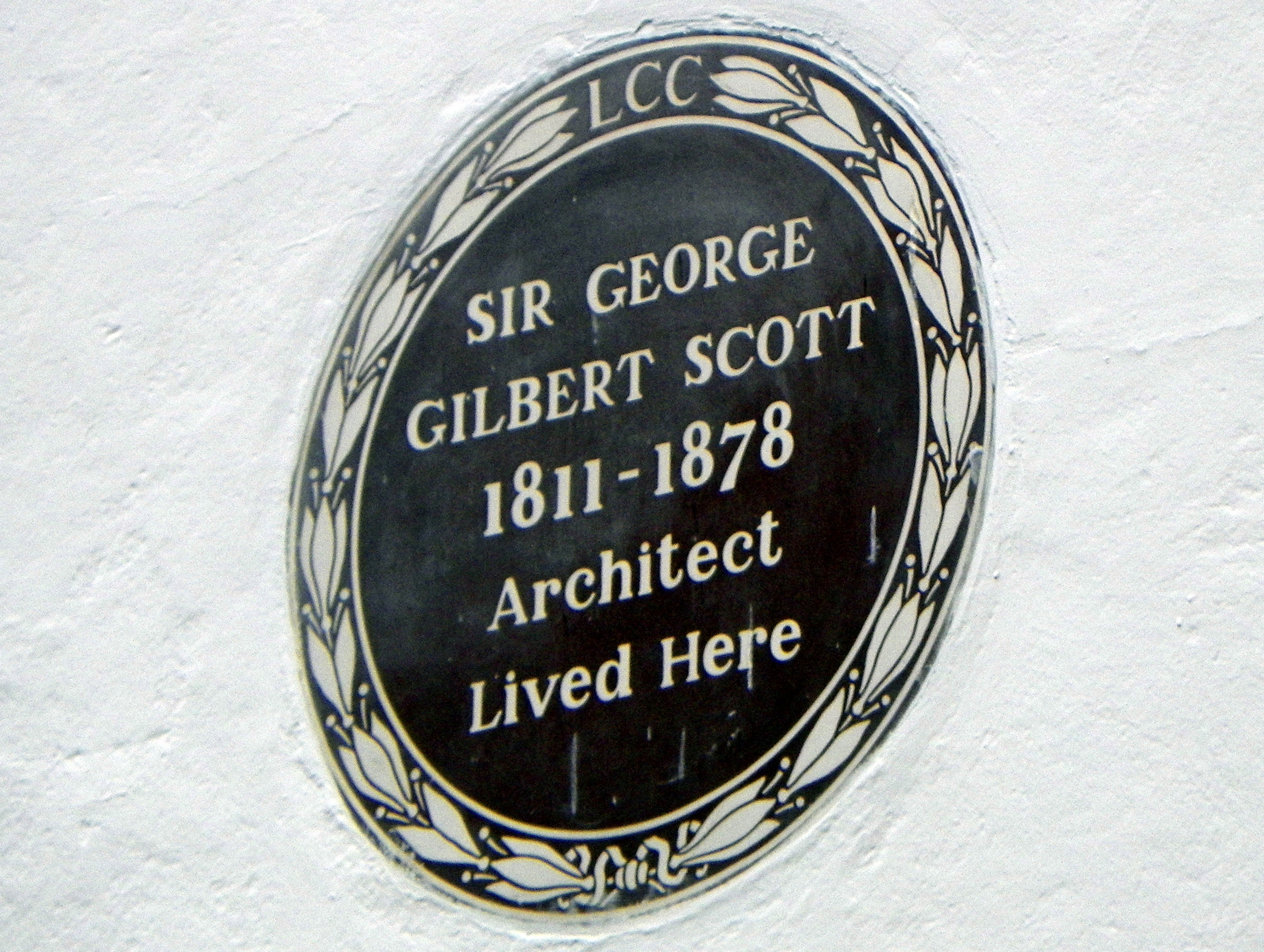
Blue plaque commemorating George Gilbert Scott who lived at Admiral's House

The house was built in 1700 by Charles Keys. The house was used as a masonic lodge between 1730 and 1745, which may have been why Keys named it Golden Spikes. It appeared on John Rocque's Map of London, 1746. Naval captain Fountain North owned the house between c. 1775 to 1811. He renamed it The Grove and added a quarterdeck to the roof of the house. He also added bulwarks and portholes to the property, and in 1805, bought the nearby grove and demolished it to extend the house's garden. In the late 18th century, the house was mistaken as belonging to Admiral Barton. The problem arose because a print of The Grove was incorrectly entitled Admiral Barton’s Hampstead. A possible explanation for the confusion was that Barton, who lived in Hampstead, fired cannon from his roof, and so it was assumed they were from the quarterdeck of The Grove. As a result, the house became known as Admiral's House, though no admiral has ever lived in the house. Admiral’s Walk, the road on which the house is situated, is similarly misnamed.

In the 19th century, John Constable painted Admiral's House a number of times. One painting, The Grove, or Admiral's House, Hampstead, was bought by Hugo von Tschudi for the Berlin Alte Nationalgalerie, was later on display at the Tate Britain, and is now in the collections of the Victoria and Albert Museum in London. The painting is believed to be the view of Admiral's House from Constable's nearby house. Another painting, The Romantic House at Hampstead has been in the collections of the National Gallery. George Gilbert Scott lived in the house between 1856 and 1865, although he decided that Hampstead was too cold for him. In 1910, London County Council commissioned a blue plaque for Scott on Admiral's House.

From 1917 to 1926, John and Winifred Fortescue lived at Admiral's House. During his time in the house, John Fortescue wrote his multi-volume book Fortescue's History of the British Army. The couple moved from Admiral's House to Windsor Castle. In 1941, Norman Thomas Janes produced a watercolour painting of Admiral's House that is located in the V&A Museum collections. Admiral's House is believed to have been an inspiration for P. L. Travers' Mary Poppins books. Travers' character Admiral Boom likes to fire cannons, as did Admiral Barton, who at the time was believed to have lived at the house. Scenes from the 1964 Mary Poppins film adaptation were filmed at Admiral's House. which was used as Admiral Boom's house in the film.

In 1950, the house was listed as a Grade II listed building. In the 1960s and 1970s, the gardens of Admiral's House and the next door Grove Lodge were opened to the public on selected dates as part of the National Gardens Scheme. In 1976, the brick and Portland stone boundary wall to the house was Grade II listed, in a separate listing from the main house, and including neighbouring properties. In the late 20th century, windows were added to the roof, and the kitchen was extended. These changes were not included in the Grade II listing of the house. Since the 1980s, Admiral's House has been owned by John Gardiner KC.

== Other buildings ==
In the 20th century, a wing of Admiral's House was converted into a separate house, named Grove House. John Galsworthy lived at Grove House from 1918 to 1933. In 2015, the owners of Grove House wanted to knock down part of the house to build an extension and 13 room basement. In the 1920s, parts of the gardens of Admiral House's were sold as land for two additional houses. Between 1931 and 1932, Edward Maufe built a studio next to the house.
