= Robert Collier, 1st Baron Monkswell =

English lawyer, politician and judge

The Right Honourable The Lord Monkswell PC QC
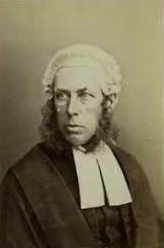

Judicial Committee of the Privy Council
- In office 23 November 1871 – 27 October 1886

Personal details
- Born: 21 June 1817
- Died: 27 October 1886 (aged 69) Grasse, France

Robert Porrett Collier, 1st Baron Monkswell, PC, QC (21 June 1817 – 27 October 1886) was an English lawyer, politician and judge.

== Background and education ==
He was the eldest son of John Collier, a merchant of Plymouth, formerly a member of the Society of Friends and MP for that town from 1832 to 1842.

Robert Collier was born in 1817, and was educated at the grammar school and other schools at Plymouth till the age of sixteen, when he was placed under the tuition of Mr Kemp, subsequently rector of St James's, Piccadilly, London.

He went to Trinity College, Cambridge, and while there wrote some clever parodies, and published a satirical poem called 'Granta'. Ill-health compelled him to abandon reading for honours and to quit the university, to which he only returned to take the ordinary B.A. degree in 1843. Already a politician, he made some speeches at Launceston in 1841 with a view to contesting the borough in the Liberal interest, but did not go to the poll, and he was an active member of the Anti-Corn Law League and addressed the meetings in Covent Garden Theatre.

== Career at the bar ==
He was called to the bar at the Inner Temple in Hilary term 1843, and joined the Western Circuit and Devonshire, Plymouth, and Devonport sessions. His first important success was a brilliant defence of some Brazilian pirates at Exeter in July 1845; the prisoners were, however, condemned to death, and the judge (Baron Platt) refused to reserve a point of law on which Collier insisted. Collier hurried to London and laid the matter before the Home Secretary (Sir James Graham) and Sir Robert Peel. Both ministers appear to have been convinced by Collier's argument, and on 5 August, it was announced in both Houses of Parliament that Baron Platt had yielded. The subsequent argument before all the judges in London of the point taken at the trial resulted in the grant of a free pardon to Collier's clients.

On his next visit to Exeter he had nineteen briefs. Local influence and wide practical knowledge gave him a good practice, and he was an excellent junior.

== Political career ==
He was appointed recorder of Penzance, and in 1852 he was returned to Parliament for Plymouth, in the Liberal interest, and retained the seat till he became a member of the Judicial Committee of the Privy Council. Lord Cranworth made him a Queen's Counsel in 1854. After a keen rivalry with Montague Edward Smith, afterwards a judge, for the foremost place, he obtained the lead of the circuit and kept it for many years

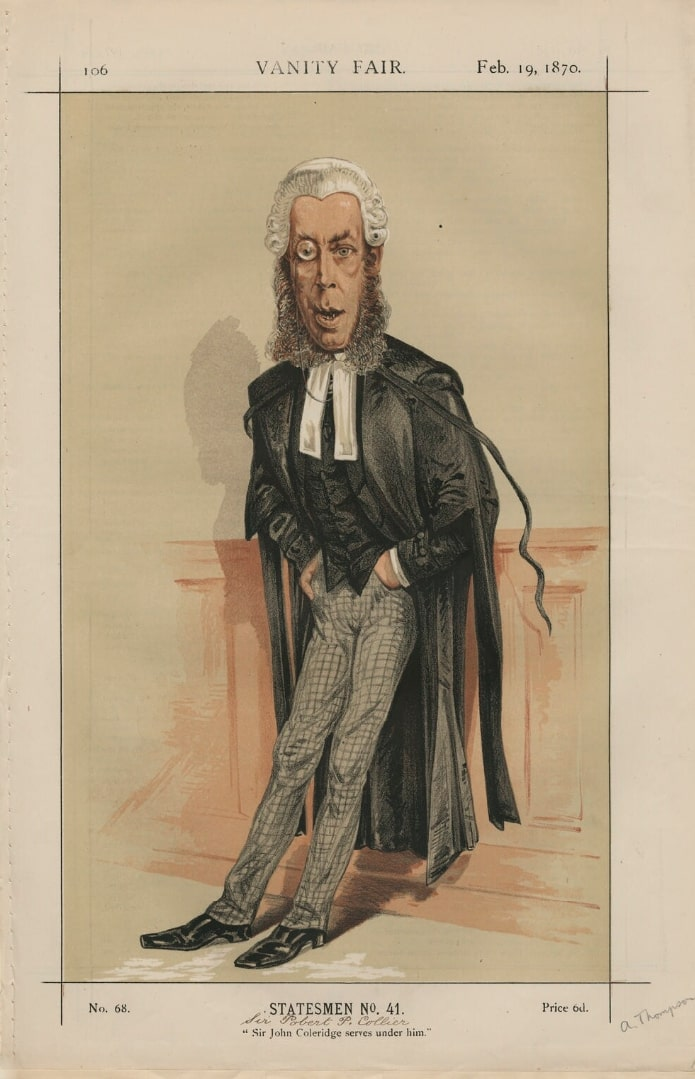
Sir Robert Collier, in a Vanity Fair caricature of 1870

In 1859, he was appointed counsel to the Admiralty and Judge-Advocate of the Fleet. It was his opinion in favour of detaining the Confederate rams in the Mersey that Mr Adams, the American minister, submitted in 1862 to Lord John Russell, and, although too late to prevent the CSS Alabama going to sea, it was afterwards adopted by the law officers of the Crown.

He had spoken frequently and with good effect in Parliament, especially on trade with Russia in 1855, but chiefly on legal topics; and when, on Sir William Atherton's retirement in October 1863, Sir Roundell Palmer became Attorney-General, Collier's appointment as Solicitor-General, (receiving the customary knighthood) in succession to him was somewhat unexpected. He filled the office, however, with success until the Liberal government resigned in 1866, and in December 1868 he became Attorney-General, and in the next year he had the conduct of the Bankruptcy Bill in the House of Commons. He was, while Attorney-General, appointed Recorder of Bristol, but resigned the appointment at once in deference to the wishes of his constituency.

== Appointment to the Judicial Committee ==
In 1871, to enable the Judicial Committee of the Privy Council, to overtake its arrears of colonial appeals, an act was passed providing for four paid judgeships, two of which were to be held by judges or ex-judges of the English bench. To none could one of the law officers be appointed. One of these two judgeships was accepted by Montague Smith. The other was offered to and refused by three English judges, and a fourth having intimated that he would refuse it if offered, Lord Hatherley, the Lord Chancellor, thought it unseemly to hawk the appointment about any further.

It was imperative that the vacancy should be at once filled, and Collier agreed to relieve the government in this difficulty. To give him the necessary technical qualification, he was first appointed to the Privy Council, on 3 November 1871. Lord Hatherley then arranged for his appointment to a vacant puisne judgeship in the Common Pleas, on 7 November 1871. Here he sat a few days only; three judgments of his are, however, reported. Though a writ was made out appointing him a serjeant, it was never executed in open court, nor was he a member of Serjeants' Inn. Then, on November 23, 1871, Gladstone appointed him to the vacancy on the Privy Council.

No doubt was cast either on his fitness for the place or on his personal conduct in accepting it; but a controversy, very damaging to the government, arose out of the appointment. Lord Chief Justice Cockburn and Chief Justice Bovill protested against it as contrary to the spirit of the act, and on 15 February 1872, Lord Stanhope made a motion in the House of Lords condemning it, which was lost only by two votes. A similar motion in the House of Commons was lost by only twenty-seven.

Collier held this post until his death, and the task of giving literary shape to the judgments of the Privy Council was frequently committed to him. In 1885, he was created a peer, as Baron Monkswell, of Monkswell in the County of Devon, taking his title from Monkswell, a small property in Devonshire.

== Works ==
He published a treatise on the Railways Clauses Acts, 1845; another on Mines in 1849; a letter to Lord John Russell on the 'Reform of the Common Law Courts,' 1851, 2nd ed. 1852; and a translation of 'Demosthenes de Coronâ' in 1875.

It was chiefly in painting, of which he was passionately fond, that he was distinguished. As a young man he drew very clever caricatures in the H.B. manner. When solicitor-general he painted in St. James's Park, and he exhibited frequently at the Royal Academy and Grosvenor Gallery, especially pictures of the neighbourhood of Rosenlaui, Switzerland, where he spent many vacations.

== Family ==
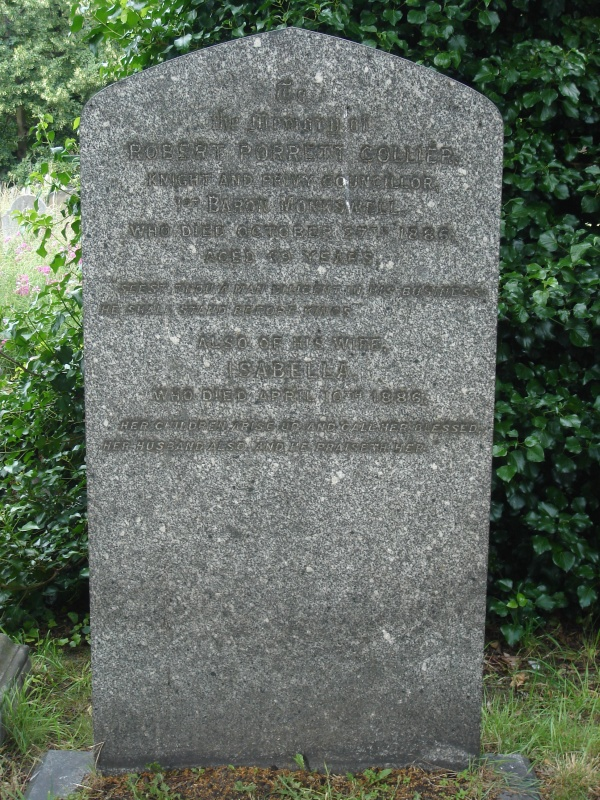
Funerary monument, Brompton Cemetery, London

Collier married in 1844 Isabella Rose (1815–1886), daughter of William Rose of Woolston Heath. near Rugby. Both Collier and his son John were keen painters. Around 1880, Collier had a new home built at 7 Chelsea Embankment, including artists' studios.

After her sudden death in April 1886, in failing health, he went to the Riviera, and died at Grasse on 27 October 1886. He was buried in London on 3 November. His grave lies on the east side of the main path from the north entrance to the central colonnades in Brompton Cemetery in London.

He was succeeded by his son Robert, a barrister, who graduated in the first class of the Cambridge law tripos, 1866, and held the post of conveyancing counsel to the treasury; his son John, was a well-known artist; and his daughter Margaret, Mme. Galetti di Cadilhac, wrote both Our Home by the Adriatic and Prince Peerless, a fairy tale.

== Arms ==
Coat of arms of Robert Collier, 1st Baron Monkswell
Crest A demiman affronttee Proper holding in the dexter hand an oak branch slipped and leaved Proper fructed Or and resting the sinister hand on an escutcheon Azure charged with two keys saltirewise Or. Escutcheon Argent on a chevron Azure between in chief two demi-unicorns courant and in base an elephant's head erased Gules three oak branches slipped leaved and fructed Or. Supporters Two druids vested Argent wreathed about the temples with laurel leaves Vert each resting the exterior hand on an escutcheon Azure charged with a balance suspended Or. Motto Persevere

== Judicial decisions ==
In 1873, Collier gave the decision for the Judicial Committee in R v Coote, the first Canadian constitutional law case decided by the Judicial Committee under the British North America Act, 1867. Collier upheld the power of the province of provinces to give fire commissioners the power to compel witnesses to testify in inquiries into fires.

Parliament of the United Kingdom
Preceded by Viscount Ebrington; Roundell Palmer	Member of Parliament for Plymouth; 1852–1871; With: Charles John Mare 1852–1853; Roundell Palmer 1853–1857; James White 1857–1859; Viscount Valletort 1859–1861; Walter Morrison from 1861	Succeeded by Sir Edward Bates, Bt; Walter Morrison
Legal offices
Preceded by Sir William Atherton	Judge Advocate of the Fleet; 1859–1863	Succeeded by Thomas Phinn
Preceded by Sir Roundell Palmer	Solicitor General for England and Wales; 1863–1866	Succeeded by William Bovill
Preceded by John Burgess Karslake	Attorney General for England and Wales; 1868–1871	Succeeded by Sir John Coleridge
Peerage of the United Kingdom
New creation	Baron Monkswell; 1885–1886	Succeeded by Robert Collier
