= Elizabeth Parrish Starr =

American heiress

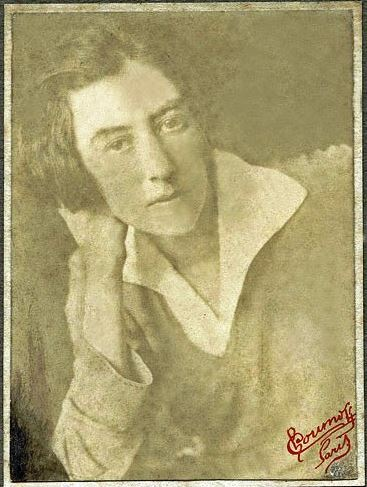
Elizabeth Parrish Starr when aged 31 yrs in 1921

Elizabeth Parrish Starr (April 29, 1889 – 1943) was an American heiress who volunteered in Europe during both World War I and World War II, dying from starvation at the end of the second.

== Early life and education ==
Elizabeth (Elisabeth) Parrish Starr was born on April 29, 1889, at 1504 Walnut Avenue, Philadelphia. Later, the family moved to 1818 South Rittenhouse Square, Philadelphia. She was the daughter of Louis Starr (1849-1925), a doctor, who was one of the first to establish paediatrics as a branch and son of Isaac Starr, a banker, and Mary Parrish (1855-1928), a member of the Pennsylvania Society of the Colonial Dames of America. Dillwyn Parrish, the American writer, illustrator, and painter, was a cousin.

In 1907, she attended schools in Europe.

== Career ==
In 1909, Starr became engaged with Stewart Robinson, the nephew of President Theodore Roosevelt and a Harvard fellow student to Starr's brother Dillwyn. Soon afterward, Robinson died in a strange accident, falling down from a window dorm.

In 1914, Starr's brother, Lieutenant Dillwyn Parrish Starr (1884-1916), joined the British Army as an officer in the 2nd Coldstream Guards. Starr joined the United States voluntary aid programme in Europe as a Volunteer Nurse and member of the French War Emergency Fund. In 1916, Dillwyn Starr died during the Battle of the Somme. Starr, Head of Reconstruction of the Civilian Section of the Somme region, was decorated by the French government with a silver medal, the Médaille de la Reconnaissance Francaise.

In 1921, Starr bought a castle that was actually an old country house, Castello San Peyre, at Opio. In 1934 she became friends with Winifred Fortescue, a British writer and actress, who would in the end move to Opio to live with Starr. Starr is Mademoiselle in Fortescue's books. They spent several years in Provence, and they made friends with an array of personalities: poet John Betjeman; nobleman and aesthete Edward Sackville-West; and Starr's unrequited love, Lady Caroline Paget, immortalized in the painting by Rex Whistler.

At the beginning of World War II, Starr founded the Foyers des Soldats de France. Later, Fortescue went back to England, to avoid the war, and gave lectures to raise funds to support France.

Starr remained in France, at Castello San Peyre. She gave shelter to children, and provided what help she could. Towards the end of 1942, food was scarce and Starr became ill. She probably died at the beginning of 1943 from anaemia and malnutrition.

== Death and legacy ==
Starr is buried in the little cemetery at Opio, where eight years later, her loyal friend Winifred Fortescue asked to be buried as well.

Fortescue founded The Elisabeth Starr Memorial Fund for the Children of Provence in Starr's honour.

Escape to Provence by Maureen Emerson is the story of Elisabeth Parish Starr and Winifred (Peggy) Fortescue.
