= William Garrard (soldier) =

William Garrard (d. 1587) was an English soldier and a writer on military tactics. He is known for The Arte of VVarre, completed by a certain Captain Hitchcock, and published four years after Garrard's death. J. W. Fortescue calls it the earliest military pamphlet written by an Englishman. The title page states that the author had served with the King of Spain for fourteen years and died in 1587.
