= Thomas Gill (1788–1861) =

British Whig politician and industrialist

Member of Parliament for Plymouth
- In office 1 July 1841 – 29 July 1847 Serving with Hugh Fortescue
- Preceded by: John Collier; Thomas Bewes
- Succeeded by: Hugh Fortescue; Roundell Palmer

Personal details
- Born: 1788 Tavistock, Devon, England
- Died: 20 October 1861 (aged 72–73) Tavistock, Devon, England
- Party: Whig

Thomas Gill (1788 – 20 October 1861) was a British Whig politician and industrialist.

Born in 1788 in Tavistock, Devon, Gill founded the Milbay Soaps Works in 1818 and, at some point, worked in the Tavistock Iron Works. He was also chairman of the South Devon Railway Company.

Gill was elected a Whig Member of Parliament for Plymouth at the 1841 general election but stepped down at the next election in 1847.

Parliament of the United Kingdom
Preceded by John Collier; Thomas Bewes	Member of Parliament for Plymouth; 1841–1847; With: Hugh Fortescue	Succeeded by Hugh Fortescue; Roundell Palmer
