= C. M. Ridding =

(Caroline) Mary Ridding (30 August 1862 – 9 November 1941) was a scholar of Sanskrit and Pali, and a librarian. She is known for translating Banabhatta's Kadambari into English in 1896.

== Life ==
Ridding was born in Meriden, West Midlands (then in Warwickshire). Her father, William Ridding (1830–1900), was the vicar of Meriden and also played cricket, and her mother was Caroline Selina Caldecott. She was also close to Lady Laura Ridding, the wife of her uncle George Ridding.

She won a scholarship to read Classics at Girton College in 1883 and was there until 1886. After this, she financed her further studies by taking up tutoring, including a job as a classics tutor in London.

She was one of the first (and possibly the first) English woman Sanskrit scholars, and published a translation of Bāṇabhaṭṭa's portion of the Kādambarī in 1896.

She was a student of E. B. Cowell and, following his death in 1903, was instrumental in getting about 260 books of his as an acquisition ("Cowell Library") into the Girton College Library in 1904. She catalogued these books herself, and was the first woman to be officially employed in the Cambridge University Library, going on to catalogue many important collections.

In 1923, when Cambridge University began to allow women to receive titular degrees, she got her Master of Arts degree.

Apart from being a scholar in Sanskrit in Pali, she also knew a bit of Bengali and Hindi. In later life she was particularly interested in Tibet, and was a reviewer for Tibetan books in the Journal of Asiatic Studies.

She was an admirer of Charlotte Mary Yonge, and presented her collection of Yonge's work to Girton College before and at her death.

The Ridding Reading Prize competition at Girton College was founded in her honour.
