= Seymour Fortescue =

British naval officer

Captain The Honourable Sir Seymour Fortescue GCVO CMG
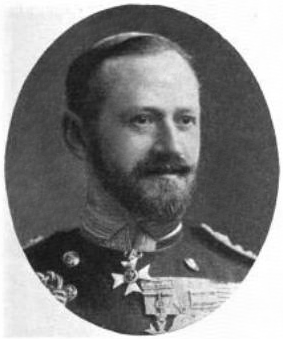
- In The Sketch, 22 July 1903
- Born: 10 February 1856
- Died: 20 March 1942 (aged 86); London, England
- Occupation: Naval officer
- Parents: Hugh Fortescue, 3rd Earl Fortescue (father); Georgiana Augusta Caroline Dawson-Damer (mother)

Captain Sir Seymour John Fortescue, GCVO, CMG (10 February 1856 – 20 March 1942) was a British naval officer and courtier who was an Equerry to the British sovereign and Serjeant-at-Arms in the House of Lords.

== Early life and family ==
Seymour John Fortescue was born on 10 February 1856, the second son of Hugh Fortescue, 3rd Earl Fortescue, DL (1818–1905), a Liberal Member of Parliament and peer who served in Lord John Russell's administration, and his wife, Georgiana Augusta Caroline Dawson-Damer (1826–1866), eldest daughter of the Hon. George Lionel Dawson-Damer. Fortescue's immediate family were well-connected in the military: his younger brother, Henry Dudley, was killed in action in 1900 and another, John William, was librarian at Windsor Castle and a noted military historian. They were also extensive landowners, with property in Ireland, South Devon, Gloucester and Lincolnshire (including Tattershall Castle), as well as Castle Hill in North Devon, where Fortescue was born.

In 1859, the young Fortescue accompanied his family to live in Medeira for two years, where an uncle was recovering from tuberculosis (the island was then a sort of fashionable sanatorium). While there, he met Captain (later Admiral of the Fleet) Henry Keppel, whose wife-to-be lived in a villa near the Fortescues; Keppel permitted the young Fortescue aboard his ship, the frigate Forte, a visit he would remember fondly in his memoirs, Looking Back. He also recalled the Empress of Austria's visit to the island in 1859, aboard HMY Victoria and Albert. Throughout the 1860s, Lord Fortescue was a sympathiser of the Italian movement and hosted its celebrities in his Devonshire home. In 1865, the young Fortescue started school in Brighton under one Mrs Walker; despite its strong reputation as a feeder preparatory school for Eton and Harrow, he chose not to pursue those routes further: "owning, I suppose, to my thorough dislike of the whole process of education, I made up my mind to go into the Navy".

== Naval and royal service ==
Fortscue joined the Royal Navy in 1869, nominated by his mother's cousin, Captain Beauchamp Seymour, and trained at Britannia as a cadet, remembering that "there is not period of my life that I look back upon with less pleasure than I do to the time I spent on Britannia", owing to its "overdone" schooling and poor food. He graduated first class the following year and was made a midshipman. After a period spent in Portsmouth, he joined HMS Bristol in 1871 and travelled to Brazil, South Africa, Ascension Island, St Helena and Gibraltar. He afterwards sailed with HMS Ariadne in the Mediterranean and then in 1873 HMS Narcissus, which was travelling to the West Indies, before being promoted to lieutenant in 1878. Later in his career, he served in the bombardment of Alexandria in 1882 and the Egytian War, and also in Eastern Sudan in 1885. He was promoted to the rank of Commander in 1890. Fortescue served in the Naval Intelligence Department between 1891 and 1893, and as Naval Aide-de-Camp to the Commander-in-Chief of British Forces in South Africa in 1899 and 1900. In 1901, he retired from the Navy with the rank of captain.

In 1893, Fortescue was also appointed an equerry in waiting to the Prince of Wales (in the place of Rear-Admiral H. F. Stephenson, CB). He remained in that post even after the Prince became King Edward VII, and served throughout that King's reign. Following the King's death in 1910, his successor George V appointed Fortescue a Groom of the Bedchamber in Waiting, although he served for less than a year before resigning in January 1911. In the meantime, he was made an Extra Equerry to the King, a position renewed by Edward VIII and George VI in 1937. Between 1910 and 1936, Fortescue also served as Sergeant-at-Arms to the House of Lords.

Fortescue's long service to the Royal Household and the Navy was rewarded with several honours. He was appointed Commander of the Order of St Michael and St George in 1900, followed a year later with an appointment as Commander of the Royal Victorian Order, in which order promotions to Knight Commander (1910) and Knight Grand Cross (1931) followed. He died after stepping from a train and missing the platform at Victoria Station on 20 March 1942.
