= Admiral's House =

Admiral's House may refer to:

- Admiral's House (Governors Island), New York
- Admiral's House, Hampstead, London
- Admiral's House (Washington), former name of Number One Observatory Circle
