= Radding =

Radding is a surname. Notable people with the surname include:

- Barbara Morgan (née Radding, born 1951), American teacher and a former NASA astronaut
- Cynthia Radding, American historian and specialist in Latin American studies

== See also ==
- Radding Building, historic building in Springfield, Massachusetts, U.S.
- Redding (surname), another surname
- Ridding, another surname
