= Charles Ridding =

English cricketer

Personal information
- Full name: Charles Henry Ridding
- Born: 26 November 1825; Winchester, Hampshire, England
- Died: 13 March 1905 (aged 79); Funtley, Hampshire, England
- Height: 5 ft 5 in (1.65 m)
- Batting: Right-handed
- Bowling: Unknown
- Role: Occasional wicket-keeper
- Relatives: William Ridding (brother); Arthur Ridding (brother)

Domestic team information
- Years: Team
- 1845–1849: Oxford University
- 1852: Marylebone Cricket Club
- 1861: Hampshire (pre-county club)
- 1864: Hampshire

Career statistics
Competition	First-class
Matches	29
Runs scored	492
Batting average	11.71
100s/50s	–/–
Top score	33
Balls bowled	?
Wickets	1
Bowling average	?
5 wickets in innings	–
10 wickets in match	–
Best bowling	1/?
Catches/stumpings	12/–
- Source: Cricinfo, 30 January 2010

Charles Henry Ridding (26 November 1825 – 13 March 1905) was an English first-class cricketer and clergyman.

The son of The Reverend Charles Ridding, he was born at Winchester in November 1825. He was educated there at Winchester College, where he played for the college cricket team. From there, he matriculated to Trinity College, Oxford, prior to receiving a demyship to Magdalen College. While studying at Oxford, Ridding played first-class cricket for Oxford University Cricket Club, making his debut against the Marylebone Cricket Club (MCC) at Oxford in 1845, and playing in The University Match against Cambridge University in his debut season. He played for Oxford until 1849, making twelve first-class appearances and captaining the university in his final year. He made two additional first-class appearances during his studies in 1848, for a combined Oxford and Cambridge Universities team against the Gentlemen of England, and for the Gentlemen in the Gentlemen v Players fixture.

After graduating from Oxford, Ridding was ordained as a deacon and undertook his first ecclesiastical role as curate at Theale in Berkshire in 1849, before being appointed curate at Tangley in Hampshire in 1852, a post he held until 1857. His religious duties largely obligated him to discontinue his participation in cricket much earlier than he otherwise would have. Nevertheless, in the early 1850s he played for the Marylebone Cricket Club (MCC) and various Gentlemen sides, whilst also appearing for in the Over 30 v Under 30 fixture. Ridding maintained his connection with Magdalen College, being elected a fellow in 1856, its bursar in 1861, and vice-president in 1863. Having appeared for Hampshire against the MCC in 1861, he later played for the nascent Hampshire County Cricket Club in its inaugural first-class match against Sussex at Southampton in 1864, with him making a further appearance that season in the return fixture at Hove. From his debut in 1849, Ridding played a total of 29 first-class matches. In these, he scored 492 runs at average of 11.71 and a highest score of 33. He was remembered by Wisden as a "splendid wicket-keeper and long-stop, never using pads or gloves. He was, in addition, a good steady batsman."

In 1865, Ridding was appointed reverend at Slimbridge, Gloucestershire. He remained there in post until his death in March 1905, at Funtley, Hampshire. Ridding has been married since 1865, to the daughter of Timothy Stonhouse Vigor. His brother's, William and Arthur, both played first-class cricket and held ecclesiastical positions; a third brother, George, was a bishop and prominent educator.
