= The Grove, Hampstead (painting) =

Painting by John Constable

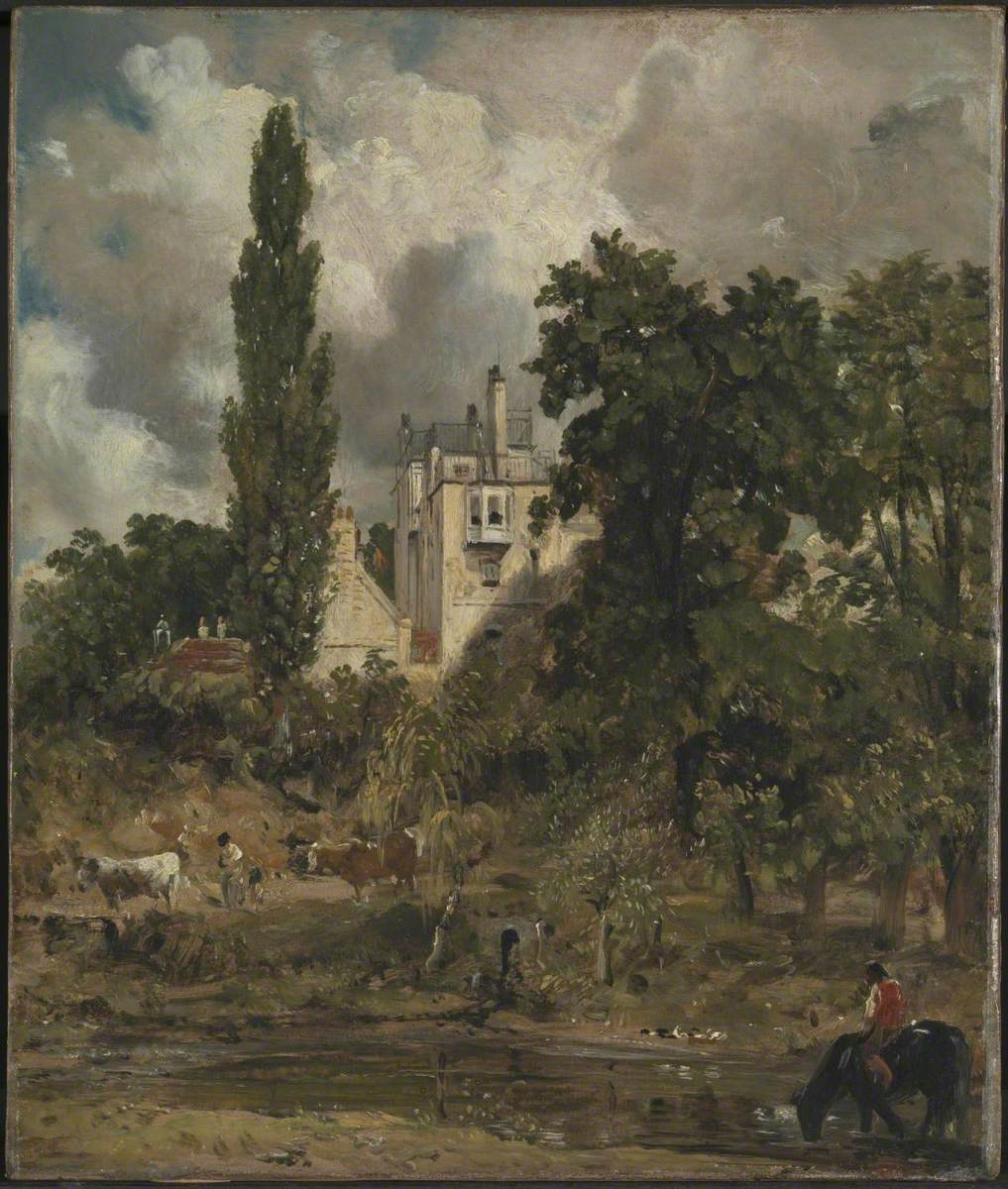
- Artist: John Constable
- Year: 1821–1822
- Type: Oil on canvas, landscape painting
- Dimensions: 35.6 cm × 30.2 cm (14.0 in × 11.9 in)
- Location: Tate Britain, London

The Grove, Hampstead is an 1822 landscape painting by the British artist John Constable. It depicts a scene in Hampstead then a rural settlement on the northern outskirts of London. The main focus is The Grove, a building now known as the Admiral's House. The building features in a number of Constable's Hampstead paintings. He lived in the area and produced many views of the Heath and landmarks.

The painting was presented to the National Gallery by Constable's daughter Isabel in 1888 as part of the Constable Bequest. In 1962 it was transferred to the collection of the Tate in Pimlico.

== See also ==
- List of paintings by John Constable

== Bibliography ==
- Bailey, Anthony. John Constable: A Kingdom of his Own. Random House, 2012.
- Charles, Victoria. Constable. Parkstone International, 2015.
- Hamilton, James. Constable: A Portrait. Hachette UK, 2022.
- Parris, Leslie. The Tate Gallery Constable Collection: A Catalogue. Tate Gallery Publications Department, 1981.
- Piper, David. Artists' London. Oxford University Press, 1982.
- Reynolds, Graham. Constable's England. Metropolitan Museum of Art, 1983.
