= Baron Monkswell =

Barony in the Peerage of the United Kingdom

Baron Monkswell, of Monkswell in the County of Devon, is a title in the Peerage of the United Kingdom. It was created in 1885 for the lawyer and Liberal politician Sir Robert Collier. His eldest son, the second Baron, served as Under-Secretary of State for War in 1895 in the Liberal administration of Lord Rosebery. His grandson, the fourth Baron (who succeeded his uncle in the title), disclaimed the peerage on 7 April 1964. He had earlier been a member of the Essex County Council. As of 2020 the title is held by his grandson, the sixth Baron, who succeeded in that year.

The artist John Collier was the younger son of the first Baron. His son, Sir Laurence Collier, was British Ambassador to Norway from 1939 to 1950.

== Barons Monkswell (1885) ==
- Robert Porrett Collier, 1st Baron Monkswell (1817–1886)
- Robert Collier, 2nd Baron Monkswell (1845–1909)
- Robert Alfred Hardcastle Collier, 3rd Baron Monkswell (1875–1964)
- William Adrian Larry Collier, 4th Baron Monkswell (1913–1984) (disclaimed 1964)
- Gerard Collier, 5th Baron Monkswell (1947–2020)
- James Adrian Collier, 6th Baron Monkswell (b. 1977)

The heir presumptive is the present holder's brother, the Hon. Robert William Gerard Collier (born 1979)

Coat of arms of Baron Monkswell
Crest A demiman affronttee Proper holding in the dexter hand an oak branch slipped and leaved Proper fructed Or and resting the sinister hand on an escutcheon Azure charged with two keys saltirewise Or. Escutcheon Argent on a chevron Azure between in chief two demi-unicorns courant and in base an elephant's head erased Gules three oak branches slipped leaved and fructed Or. Supporters Two druids vested Argent wreathed about the temples with laurel leaves Vert each resting the exterior hand on an escutcheon Azure charged with a balance suspended Or. Motto Persevere
