= Hugh Fortescue, 3rd Earl Fortescue =

British peer and Liberal Party politician (1818-1905)

The Right Honourable The Earl Fortescue DL
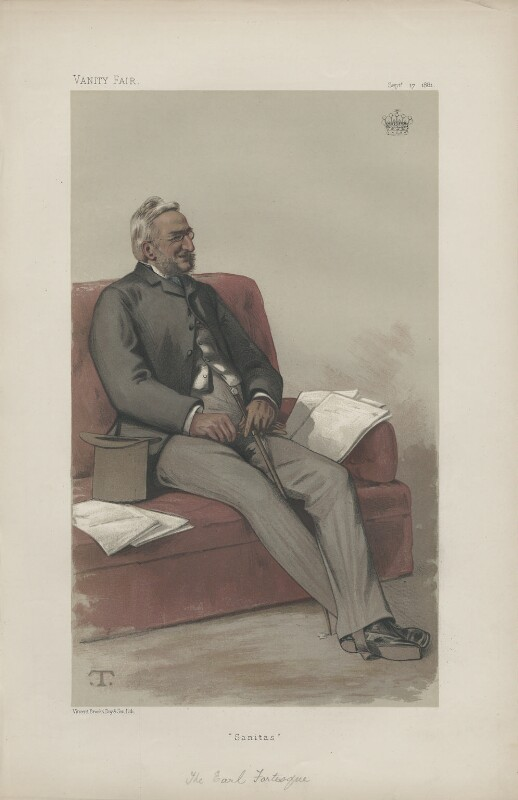
- "Sanitas"; Fortescue as caricatured in Vanity Fair, September 1881

Member of Parliament for Plymouth
- In office 1841–1852 Serving with Roundell Palmer
- Preceded by: John Collier; Thomas Beaumont Bewes
- Succeeded by: Charles John Mare; Robert Collier

Member of Parliament for Marylebone
- In office 1854–1859 Serving with Sir Benjamin Hall, Bt
- Preceded by: Sir Benjamin Hall, Bt; Lord Dudley Coutts Stuart
- Succeeded by: Sir Benjamin Hall, Bt; Edwin James

Parliamentary Secretary to the Poor Law Board
- In office 1847–1851
- Preceded by: None
- Succeeded by: Ralph William Grey

Personal details
- Born: 4 April 1818 London, England
- Died: 10 October 1905 (aged 87)
- Party: Liberal
- Spouse: Georgiana Augusta Caroline Dawson-Damer (m. 1847; died 1866)
- Children: 14
- Parents: Hugh Fortescue, 2nd Earl Fortescue (father); Lady Susan Ryder (mother)
- Relatives: Hugh Fortescue, 4th Earl Fortescue (son); Sir Seymour John Fortescue (son); John William Fortescue (son); Charles Granville Fortescue (son); Dudley Ryder (maternal grandfather)

Hugh Fortescue, 3rd Earl Fortescue DL (4 April 1818 – 10 October 1905), known as Viscount Ebrington from 1841 to 1861, was a British peer and occasional Liberal Party politician.

== Life ==
He was born in London on 4 April 1818. He was the eldest son of Hugh Fortescue, 2nd Earl Fortescue (1783-1861), by his first wife, Lady Susan (died 1827), eldest daughter of Dudley Ryder, 1st Earl of Harrowby. He was a Cambridge Apostle.

He was appointed Deputy Lieutenant of Devon on 4 March 1839.

He entered the House of Commons in 1841 as a member for Plymouth. He lost this seat in 1852, but returned in 1854 for Marylebone, which seat he held until January 1859, when he resigned. In December of that year, however, he was called up to the House of Lords by a writ of acceleration. In 1861, he succeeded to his father's earldom.

== Family ==
He married Georgiana Augusta Caroline Dawson-Damer (13 June 1826 – 8 Dec 1866), granddaughter of John Dawson, 1st Earl of Portarlington, on 1 March 1847. They had fourteen children:

- Lady Susan Elizabeth (born 1848, died 7 July 1919), never married.
- Lady Mary Eleanor Fortescue (born 1849, died 12 October 1938), married George Bridgeman.
- Lady Lucy Catherine Fortescue (born 1851, died 19 March 1940), married Michael Hicks-Beach, 1st Earl St Aldwyn and had issue.
- Lady Georgiana Seymour Fortescue (born 1852, died 24 December 1915), married her cousin, Lord Ernest Seymour, son of Francis Seymour, 5th Marquess of Hertford and had issue.
- Hugh Fortescue, 4th Earl Fortescue (born 16 April 1854, died 29 October 1932)
- Captain Hon. Sir Seymour John Fortescue, RN (born 10 February 1856, died 20 March 1942), died unmarried.
- Major Hon. Lionel Henry Dudley Fortescue (born 19 November 1857, killed in action 11 June 1900), married Emily Adam
- Captain Hon. Arthur Grenville Fortescue (born 24 December 1858, died 3 October 1895), of Hudscott, Chittlehampton, Devon, married Lilla Fane and had issue
- Major Hon. Sir John William Fortescue (born 28 December 1859, died 22 October 1933), married Winifred Beech
- Brigadier-General Hon. Charles Granville Fortescue (born 30 October 1861, died 1 February 1951), married Ethel Clarke, daughter of Sir Charles Clarke, 3rd Baronet and had issue.
- Lady Eleanor Hester Fortescue (born 1863, died 11 Sept 1864)
- Alice Sophia Fortescue (born 1864, died 12 Nov 1881)
- Lady Frances Blanche Fortescue (born 1865, died 24 October 1950), married Archibald Hay Gordon-Duff. Their daughter Jane Minney Gordon-Duff married Ronald Roxburgh.
- William George Damer Fortescue, R.N. (born 8 Dec 1866, lost at sea in September 1887)

== Notes ==
Parliament of the United Kingdom
Preceded by John Collier; Thomas Beaumont Bewes	Member of Parliament for Plymouth; 1841–1852; With: Roundell Palmer	Succeeded by Charles John Mare; Robert Collier
Preceded by Sir Benjamin Hall, Bt; Lord Dudley Coutts Stuart	Member of Parliament for Marylebone; 1854–1859; With: Sir Benjamin Hall, Bt	Succeeded by Sir Benjamin Hall, Bt; Edwin James
Political offices
Preceded by None	Parliamentary Secretary to the Poor Law Board; 1847–1851	Succeeded by Ralph William Grey
Peerage of Great Britain
Preceded by Hugh Fortescue	Earl Fortescue; 1861–1905	Succeeded by Hugh Fortescue
Preceded by Hugh Fortescue	Baron Fortescue (writ in acceleration); 1859–1905	Succeeded by Hugh Fortescue
