= Thomas Bewes =

British politician

Thomas Beaumont Bewes (18 December 1777 – 18 November 1857) was a British politician.

The son of John Bewes, Mayor of Plymouth, Thomas first stood for Parliament in Plymouth at the 1806 UK general election, but failed to win the seat. His wife died three years later, and he moved to Tothill House with his sister-in-law, who brought up his children. He later moved to a property which he renamed Beaumont House, and served a term as High Sheriff of Devon.

Bewes was a strong advocate of the Reform Act 1832. At the 1832 UK general election, he stood for the constituency of Plymouth, and won a seat as a Whig. On the radical wing of the party, he argued for removing bishops from the House of Lords. He held his seat at the 1835 and 1837 UK general elections, and stood down in 1841.

He was high sheriff of Devon in 1823.

== Sources ==
- Hughes, A. (1898). List of Sheriffs for England and Wales from the Earliest Times to A.D. 1831. London: Eyre & Spottiswoode. (with amendments of 1963, Public Record Office)

Parliament of the United Kingdom
Preceded by George Cockburn; Thomas Byam Martin	Member of Parliament for Plymouth; 1832–1841; With: John Collier	Succeeded by Hugh Fortescue; Thomas Gill
