= Robert Collier, 3rd Baron Monkswell =

British aristocrat and writer on railways

Robert Alfred Hardcastle Collier, 3rd Baron of Monkswell (13 December 1875 – 14 January 1964), known as Robert Collier before 1909, was a British aristocrat and writer on railways.

He joined the Diplomatic Service, and in April 1902 was appointed Third Secretary.

Collier succeeded to the barony in 1909 on the death of the 2nd Baron Monkswell, his father. He was one of 112 peers (known as the "diehards") to vote against the Parliament Act 1911 in the House of Lords.

Ezra Pound accused Lord Monkswell of displaying arrogance in his faith in capitalism, in an article he penned for The Globe in its last issue of 1919. Monkswell is quoted as writing there, "A man without any tools can produce nothing" to which Pound replied, in The New Age Vol. 26 #12, January 22, 1920, "Loophole being that one can make poems out of mere words, and that many have done so; but lacking speech one can say nothing".

During the General Strike of 1926, Lord Monkswell worked as a signalman at Marylebone Railway Station.

Coat of arms of Robert Collier, 3rd Baron Monkswell
| Crest A demiman affronttee Proper holding in the dexter hand an oak branch slipped and leaved Proper fructed Or and resting the sinister hand on an escutcheon Azure charged with two keys saltirewise Or. Escutcheon Argent on a chevron Azure between in chief two demi-unicorns courant and in base an elephant's head erased Gules three oak branches slipped leaved and fructed Or. Supporters Two druids vested Argent wreathed about the temples with laurel leaves Vert each resting the exterior hand on an escutcheon Azure charged with a balance suspended Or. Motto Persevere |

== Notes ==
Peerage of the United Kingdom
| Preceded by Robert Collier | Baron Monkswell; 1909–1964 | Succeeded by William Collier |

See Lord Monkswell's Notebooks reproduced in Railway Archive Nos. 35 and 36 and letter from Robert Humm in latter
