= Thomas Byam Martin =

Royal Navy officer and politician (1773–1854)

Admiral of the Fleet Sir Thomas Byam Martin GCB
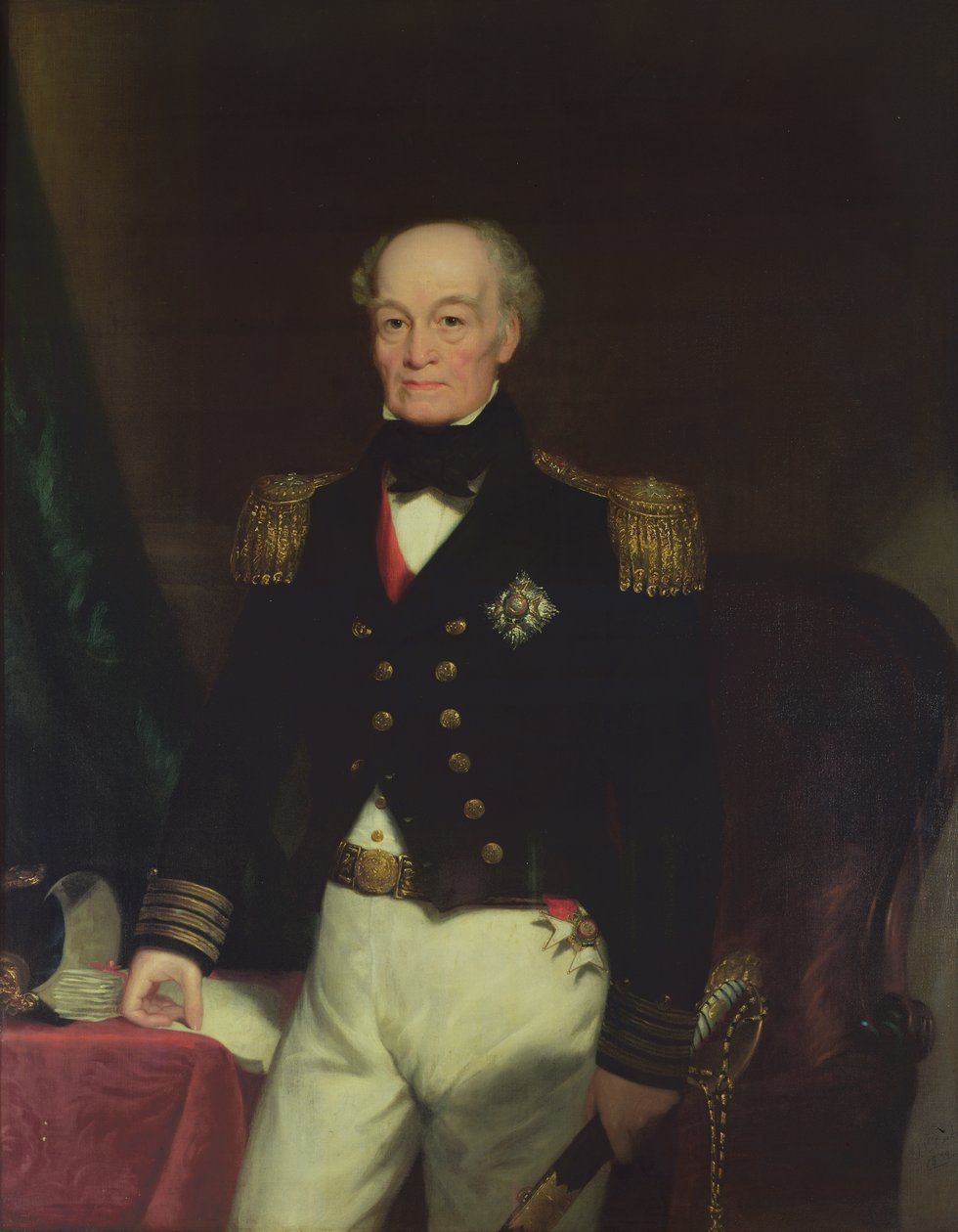
- 1852 portrait
- Born: 25 July 1773; Ashtead House, Surrey, England
- Died: 25 October 1854 (aged 81); Portsmouth, Hampshire, England
- Military career
- Allegiance: United Kingdom
- Branch: Royal Navy
- Service years: 1786–1854
- Rank: Admiral of the Fleet
- Commands: HMS Tisiphone; HMS Modeste; HMS Artois; HMS Santa Margarita; HMS Tamar; HMS Dictator; HMS Fisgard; HMS Impetueux; HMS Prince of Wales; HMS Implacable; Controller of the Navy
- Conflicts: French Revolutionary Wars; Capture of Tamise; Capture of Immortalité; Napoleonic Wars; Capture of Sewolod; Siege of Riga
- Awards: Knight Grand Cross of the Order of the Bath; Knight Grand Cross of the Order of the Sword (Sweden)
- Other work: MP for Plymouth

Admiral of the Fleet Sir Thomas Byam Martin, GCB (25 July 1773 – 25 October 1854) was a Royal Navy officer and politician. As captain of fifth-rate HMS Fisgard he took part in a duel with the French ship Immortalité and captured her at the Battle of Tory Island during the French Revolutionary Wars. Then while in command of the third-rate HMS Implacable in the Baltic Sea and attached to the Swedish Navy he took part in the capture the Russian ship Sewolod (Vsevolod) during the Napoleonic Wars. During the French invasion of Russia, Martin commanded British naval squadron supporting Russian defenders in the siege of Riga.

During his many years of service as Comptroller of the Navy, Martin was credited with reducing the fleet from the enormous size deployed against the French to a much more streamlined service geared toward protecting merchant trade and the British Empire. He also focused heavily on employing highly trained dockyard staff capable of responding rapidly to any international emergency. Martin also sat in Parliament for 14 years and was an outspoken critic of government attempts to reduce the Navy budget which ultimately saw him dismissed in 1831 by his old friend King William IV.

Martin died in October 1854, at the early stages of the Crimean War, planning the Baltic Campaign and investigating the possibilities of using poison gas weapons.

== Early life ==
Born the third son of Sir Henry Martin, 1st Baronet (later MP for Southampton) and his wife Eliza Anne Gillman (née Parker), Martin was educated at Freshford School, Southampton Grammar School and later the Royal Grammar School, Guildford. During his education, he was also enrolled on the books of several Navy ships, a custom of the period to ensure that when he was old enough to go to sea he already would have the requisite "experience" to be considered for promotion early.

Martin joined the Royal Naval College, Portsmouth in August 1785 and went to sea for the first time as a captain's servant aboard the sixth-rate HMS Pegasus, captained by Prince William Henry, on the North American Station in April 1786. Promoted to midshipman, he transferred to fifth-rate HMS Andromeda in March 1788 and subsequently to the third-rate HMS Colossus, the fifth-rate HMS Southampton, the second-rate HMS Barfleur and then the first-rate HMS Royal George.

Promoted to lieutenant on 22 October 1790, Martin served in the third-rate HMS Canada in the Channel Squadron and subsequently in the fifth-rate HMS Inconstant and the fifth-rate HMS Juno. He was promoted to commander on 22 May 1793 and given command of the fire ship HMS Tisiphone in the Mediterranean Fleet.

== War service ==
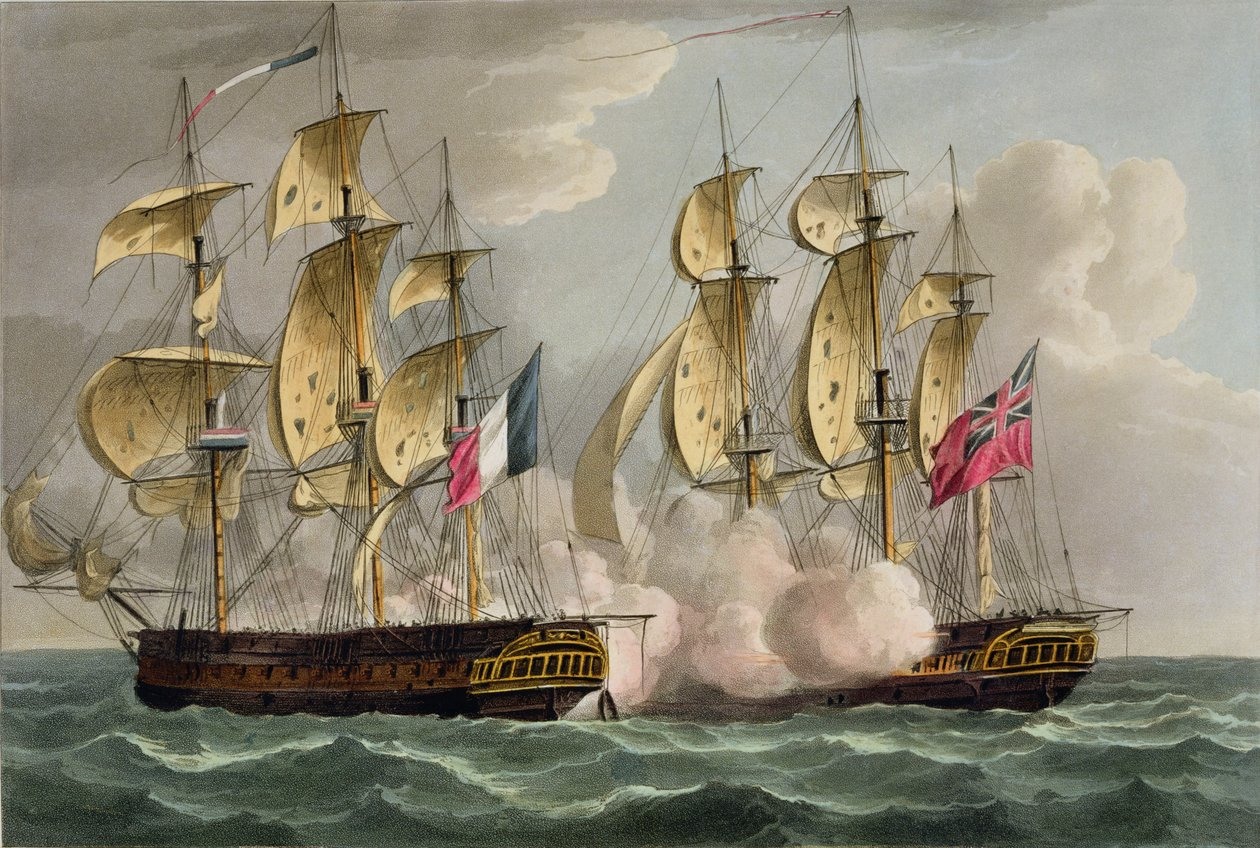
The capture of the French ship Immortalité (left) by the fifth-rate HMS Fisgard commanded by Martin (right)

Martin was promoted to captain on 5 November 1793 and given command of the fifth-rate HMS Modeste, a frigate recently captured from the French, and saw action in operations off Toulon at an early stage of the French Revolutionary Wars. He went on to command the fifth-rate HMS Artois and saw action at the siege of Bastia in April 1794. Martin was then transferred to the Channel Fleet and stationed off Ireland in HMS Santa Margarita, in which he captured the French frigate Tamise at the Atlantic raid of June 1796: in the engagement, Tamise was badly damaged and suffered heavy casualties while HMS Santa Margarita's losses were only two killed and three wounded.

In December 1796, Martin was sent to the West Indies as captain of the fifth-rate HMS Tamar in which he captured nine privateers. He then moved to the command of the third-rate HMS Dictator before taking over the newly captured fifth-rate HMS Fisgard. On 20 October 1798 HMS Fisgard took part in a duel with the French ship Immortalité and captured her at the Battle of Tory Island. Martin continued to be employed off the French coast, capturing merchant vessels, privateers and warships.

Martin was given command of the third-rate HMS Impetueux in May 1803, at the start of the Napoleonic Wars, and in her rescued many survivors from the wreck of HMS Venerable in November 1804. He transferred to the command of the second rate HMS Prince of Wales in the Channel Squadron in 1807 and to the third-rate HMS Implacable in the Baltic Sea in 1808. In HMS Implacable, Martin was attached to the Swedish Navy and took part in the capture of the Russian ship Sewolod (Vsevolod) in August 1808, for which he was awarded the Knight Grand Cross of the Order of the Sword by the Swedish King Gustaf IV Adolf.

== Senior command ==
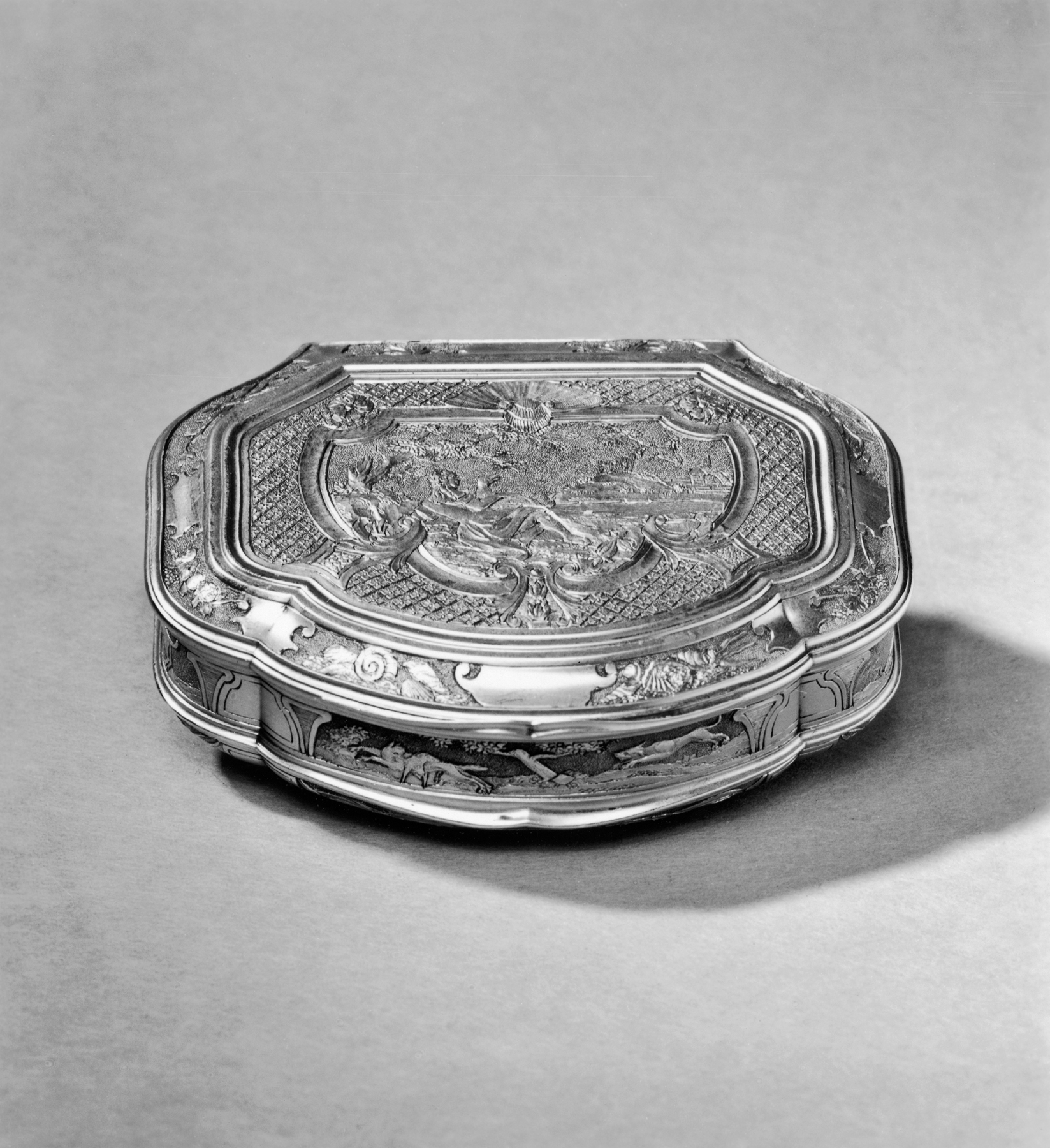
A snuff box owned by Martin

Promoted to rear-admiral on 1 August 1811, Martin was despatched with a squadron to the Baltic Sea, with his flag in the third-rate HMS Aboukir, and assisted in the defence of Riga against the Grande Armée during the French invasion of Russia. He became Second-in-Command at Plymouth Command, with his flag in the third-rate HMS Prince Frederick in 1812 and visited the Duke of Wellington's headquarters in Spain to co-ordinate army and navy supply requirements and operations in 1813. He was appointed a Knight Commander of the Order of the Bath on 4 January 1815.

Martin became Deputy Comptroller of the Navy in January 1815, advancing to full Comptroller of the Navy in February 1816, a position he maintained until November 1831 he was the last comptroller to hold the post in its original function. In this role, Martin dominated naval strategy, reducing the fleet from the enormous size deployed against the French to a much more streamlined service geared toward protecting merchant trade and the British Empire. He also focused heavily on employing highly trained dockyard staff capable of responding rapidly to any international emergency. He was promoted to vice-admiral on 12 August 1819, advanced to Knight Grand Cross of the Order of the Bath on 3 March 1830 and promoted to full admiral on 22 July 1830.

Martin's strong pro-Tory political views eventually caused his downfall, when he used his position in Parliament as member for Plymouth, for which he had been elected in July 1818, to publicly criticise the new Whig government of Earl Grey in 1830. Infuriated, Grey and Sir James Graham, who had become First Lord of the Admiralty that year, approached Martin's old friend King William IV for a solution, resulting in Martin's dismissal for insubordination in 1831. In his later years he lived at No. 53 Wimpole Street in London.

Martin was appointed Rear-Admiral of the United Kingdom on 5 May 1847 and Vice-Admiral of the United Kingdom on 10 August 1847 before being promoted to Admiral of the Fleet on 30 October 1849. As the Crimean War approached he returned to service at Portsmouth planning the Baltic Campaign and investigating the possibilities of using poison gas weapons. He died in this service at the admiral superintendent's house at Portsmouth on 21 October 1854. There is a memorial to Martin in St Ann's Church in Portsmouth. The Navy Records Society published the letters and papers of Admiral Sir Thomas Byam Martin in 3 volumes from 1898 to 1901.

== Family ==
Martin married Catherine Fanshawe, daughter of Captain Robert Fanshawe; they had three daughters and three sons (Admiral Sir William Martin, 4th Baronet, Admiral Sir Henry Byam Martin and Lieutenant-Colonel Robert Fanshawe Martin).

== Sources ==
- Heathcote, Tony (2002). The British Admirals of the Fleet 1734 – 1995. Pen & Sword. ISBN 0-85052-835-6.

Military offices
Preceded by Sir Thomas Thompson	Comptroller of the Navy; 1816–1831	Succeeded by Post Disbanded
Parliament of the United Kingdom
Preceded by Sir William Congreve; Sir Charles Pole	Member of Parliament for Plymouth; 1818–1832; With: Sir William Congreve (1818–1828); Sir George Cockburn (1828–1832)	Succeeded by John Collier; Thomas Beaumont Bewes
Honorary titles
Preceded by Sir Robert Stopford	Rear-Admiral of the United Kingdom; 1847	Succeeded by Sir George Cockburn
Preceded by Sir George Martin	Vice-Admiral of the United Kingdom; 1847–1854	Succeeded by Sir William Hall Gage
