= Charles John Mare =

British politician and shipbuilder

Member of Parliament for Plymouth
- In office 9 July 1852 – 10 May 1853 Serving with Robert Collier
- Preceded by: Hugh Fortescue; Roundell Palmer
- Succeeded by: Robert Collier; Roundell Palmer

Personal details
- Born: 1815 Staffordshire, UK
- Died: 8 February 1898 (aged 82)
- Party: Conservative

Charles John Mare (1815 – 8 February 1898) was a British Conservative politician, and shipbuilder.

== Family ==
In 1844, Mare married Mary ńee Rolt, daughter of Conservative MP for Greenwich (1852–1857) Peter Rolt, and they had at least two sons, Charles J. and John.

== Shipbuilding ==
Born in Staffordshire, Mare travelled to London where he started training to be a solicitor in Doctors' Commons but, upon his father's death in 1835, he leased the family home in Cheshire to form shipbuilding firm Ditchburn and Mare with Thomas J. Ditchburn on the Thames. They established a yard at Dudman's Creek, Deptford where they started building iron ships.

In 1838, their yard was completely destroyed by fire. It was suspected arson by rival wooden shipbuilders. They moved the business to the Orchard House Yard, Canning Town, taking over the premises of the recently bankrupt firm of William and Benjamin Wallis.

After Ditchburn's retirement in 1846, Mare continued to run the firm, and expanded the company on the west side of Bow Creek, before dissolving the partnership in 1847. The following year, he was accused in court of threatening Ditchburn but the accusations also went the other way and the case was dismissed.

In 1855, Mare found himself in financial difficulties due to several government contracts. It culminated in Mare declaring insolvency, Mare's father-in-law took over the firm and renamed it Thames Ironworks and Shipbuilding Co.

Following the bankruptcy, Mare managed the shipbuilding company belonging to W. & H. Pitcher at Northfleet until it also failed in 1857. By 1859 he had found sufficient backing to re-establish himself, this time as C.J. Mare and Co, Millwall.

Mare's business expanded and, in 1861 he took over the part of Napier's yard which John Scott Russell had unsuccessfully used to attempt to re-establish his own shipbuilding enterprise. It remained in Mare's name until being bought out by Overend, Gurney and Company in 1862.

Subsequently he did not thrive financially, was bankrupted again in 1874 and died destitute in Stepney.

== Political career ==
Mare was first elected Conservative MP for Plymouth in 1852, but was the next year unseated for bribery and corruption during the election campaign.

Parliament of the United Kingdom
Preceded by Hugh Fortescue; Roundell Palmer	Member of Parliament for Plymouth; 1852–1853; With: Robert Collier	Succeeded by Robert Collier; Roundell Palmer
