= Roundell Palmer, 1st Earl of Selborne =

British politician and Lord Chancellor (1812–1895)

The Right Honourable The Earl of Selborne PC FRS
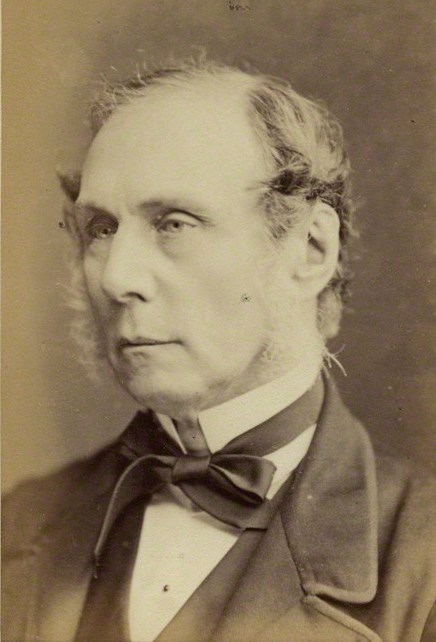
- Selborne c. 1873

Lord Chancellor
- In office 15 October 1872 – 17 February 1874
- Monarch: Victoria
- Prime Minister: William Ewart Gladstone
- Preceded by: The Lord Hatherley
- Succeeded by: The Lord Cairns
- In office 28 April 1880 – 9 June 1885
- Monarch: Victoria
- Prime Minister: William Ewart Gladstone
- Preceded by: The Earl Cairns
- Succeeded by: The Lord Halsbury

Personal details
- Born: 27 November 1812 Mixbury, Oxfordshire
- Died: 4 May 1895 (aged 82)
- Party: Conservative; Peelite; Liberal; Liberal Unionist
- Spouse: Lady Laura Waldegrave
- Children: 5, including Laura, Mary, and William
- Education: Christ Church, Oxford; Trinity College, Oxford

Roundell Palmer, 1st Earl of Selborne, PC, FRS (27 November 1812 – 4 May 1895) was an English lawyer and politician. He served twice as Lord High Chancellor of Great Britain.

== Background and education ==
Palmer was born at Mixbury in Oxfordshire, where his father, William Jocelyn Palmer, was rector. His mother Dorothea was daughter of the Rev. William Roundell of Gledstone Hall, Yorkshire. William Palmer and Edwin Palmer were his brothers. He was educated at Rugby School and Winchester College.

Palmer proceeded to the University of Oxford, matriculating from Christ Church, moving to Trinity College upon winning a scholarship there, and becoming a fellow of Magdalen College in 1834. He graduated BA in 1834 and MA in 1836. While at Oxford he became a close friend of the hymnist and theologian, Frederick William Faber. At Oxford he won the Chancellor's Prize for Latin Verse in 1831, the Ireland Scholarship in Greek and the Newdigate Prize in 1832, the Eldon Law Scholarship in 1834 and the Chancellor's Latin Essay Prize in 1835. He was President of the Oxford Union in 1832.

== Political career ==
Palmer was called to the bar at Lincoln's Inn in 1837. He preferred practice at the equity bar, and avoided juries. From 1840 to 1843 he was a leader writer for The Times. He was elected to the House of Commons for Plymouth in 1847. A Peelite, he was defeated in 1852, but was returned in a by-election the following year. He lost his seat in 1857, and was defeated again in 1859.

In 1861, Palmer was appointed Solicitor General in the government of Lord Palmerston and was returned unopposed for Richmond, receiving the customary knighthood. In 1863 he was promoted Attorney General, continuing in office under Lord Russell after Palmerston's death in 1865, until the government's defeat in 1866. His position as a law officer of the Crown meant that he had to handle the many questions of international law that arose out of the American Civil War, including the Alabama affair.

An early follower of Gladstone, Palmer broke with him over the disestablishment of the Irish Church. After the Liberals were returned in the 1868 election, he refused Gladstone's offers to appoint him either as Lord Chancellor or Lord Chief Justice, preferring to be free to oppose Irish disestablishment as a backbencher. He was the leading counsel for Britain before the Alabama Claims tribunal in Geneva.

Despite his continuing opposition to the government on Irish and Church issues, Palmer was appointed on 15 October 1872 as Lord Chancellor under Gladstone. He was created Baron Selborne, of Selborne in the County of Southampton, and was sworn of the Privy Council. His first tenure in office saw the passage of the Judicature Act 1873, which reorganised the English judiciary. Selborne again held the Lord Chancellorship under Gladstone in 1880–1885. In the latter year he established a Lord Chancellor's Department. He was created Viscount Wolmer, of Blackmoor in the County of Southampton, and the Earl of Selborne in 1882.

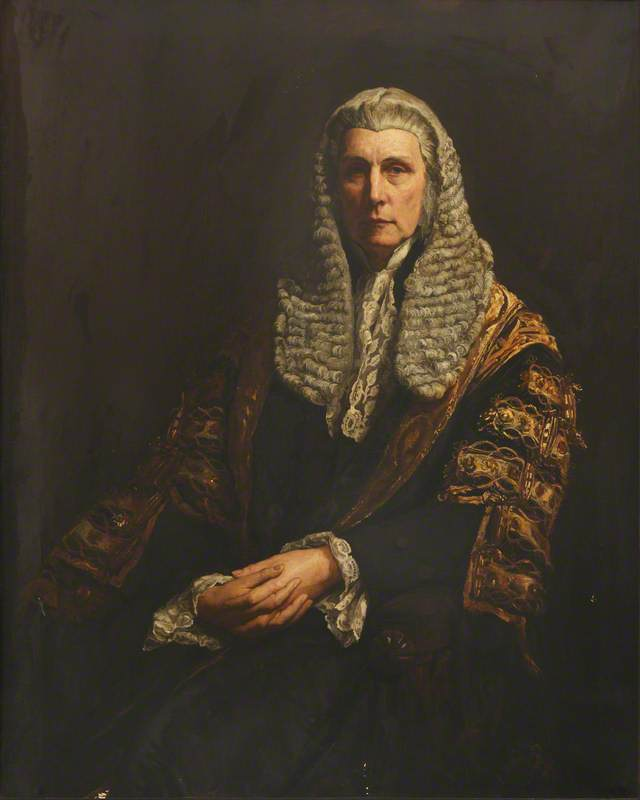
Lord Selborne as Lord Chancellor, by Walter William Ouless.

After the fall of Gladstone in 1885, Selborne became increasingly alarmed by perceived radical tendencies within the Liberal Party. He finally broke with Gladstone over Irish Home Rule, refusing reappointment as Lord Chancellor when the Liberals returned to office in 1886, and joining the Liberal Unionists.

== Honours ==
Selborne was elected a Fellow of the Royal Society in June 1860. He was an honorary fellow of Magdalen College, Oxford and an honorary Student of Christ Church, Oxford, High Steward of the University of Oxford and Lord Rector of the University of St Andrews.

== Judicial decisions ==
- Barnes v Addy (1874) LR 9 Ch App 244
- L'Union St. Jacques de Montreal v. Bélisle (1874), 6 L.R. P.C. 31, [1874] UKPC 53 (P.C.).
- Foakes v Beer [1884] UKHL 1, [1881–85] All ER Rep 106, (1884) 9 App Cas 605; 54 LJQB 130; 51 LT 833; 33 WR 233 – a leading case from the House of Lords on the legal concept of consideration

== Family and death ==
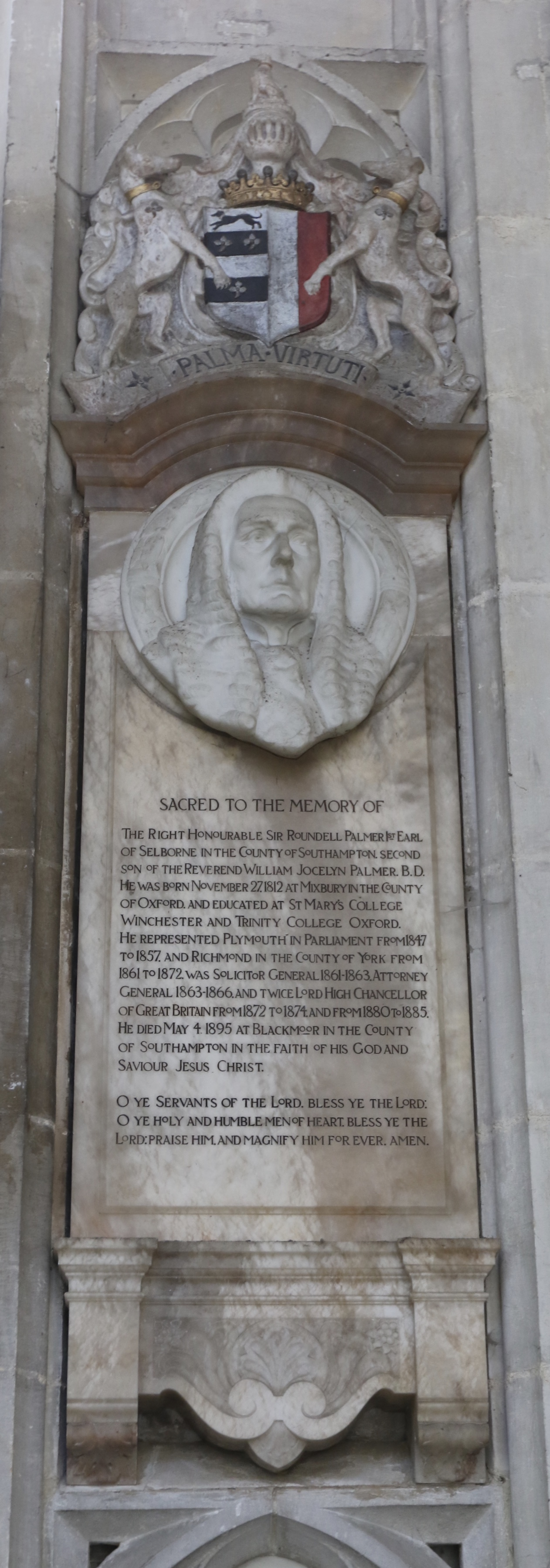
Memorial in Winchester Cathedral

Selborne married Lady Laura, daughter of William Waldegrave, 8th Earl Waldegrave, in 1848. They had four daughters followed by a son. Their eldest, Laura Elizabeth, was born in 1848 and became an author and social reformer, who in 1876 married George Ridding, the first Bishop of Southwell, so becoming known as Lady Laura Ridding. Their second, Mary Dorothea (1850–1933), married her first cousin, the 9th Earl Waldegrave in 1874. Their third, Sophia Matilda (1852–1915), named after her great-great-aunt, Princess Sophia Matilda of Gloucester, was a writer of fiction and married Amable Charles Franquet, Comte de Franqueville, in 1903. Their fourth, Sarah Wilfreda (1854–1910) married her second cousin, George Tournay Biddulph, son of Robert Biddulph, in 1883. Their son William Palmer, 2nd Earl of Selborne later became a prominent Unionist politician.

Lady Selborne died in April 1885. Lord Selborne survived her by ten years and died in May 1895, aged 82.

== Arms ==
Coat of arms of Roundell Palmer, 1st Earl of Selborne
Crest A mount vert, thereon a greyhound sejant sable, collared or, charged on the shoulder with a trefoil slipped argent. Escutcheon Argent, two bars sable, charged with three trefoils slipped of the field; in chief a greyhound courant of the second, collared or. Supporters On either side a greyhound sable, collared or, and charged on the shoulder with a trefoil slipped argent. Motto Palma Virtuti (The palm is for virtue)

== Publications ==
- Palmer, Roundell (November 1886). A Defence of the Church of England Against Disestablishment (1 ed.). London. OCLC 57501388. 2nd ed. (London, December 1886), 3rd ed. (London, March 1887), 4th ed. (London, February 1888)
- Palmer, Roundell (1888). Ancient facts and fictions concerning churches and tithes. London; New York: Macmillan. LCCN 03002193. OCLC 60714511.
- Selborne Memorials (London, 1896–98)
  - Palmer, Roundell (1896). Memorials. Part 1, Family and personal, 1766–1865. Vol. I. London; New York: Macmillan. OCLC 277580024.
  - Palmer, Roundell (1896). Memorials. Part 1, Family and personal, 1766–1865. Vol. II. London; New York: Macmillan. OCLC 277580029.
  - Palmer, Roundell (1898). Memorials, Part II. Personal and Political. Vol. I. London; New York: Macmillan. OCLC 831400848.
  - Palmer, Roundell (1898). Memorials, Part II. Personal and Political. Vol. II. London; New York: Macmillan. OCLC 277583879.

Parliament of the United Kingdom
Preceded by Thomas Gill; Viscount Ebrington	Member of Parliament for Plymouth; 1847–1852; With: Viscount Ebrington	Succeeded by Charles John Mare; Robert Collier
Preceded by Charles John Mare; Robert Collier	Member of Parliament for Plymouth; 1853–1857; With: Robert Collier	Succeeded by James White; Robert Collier
Preceded by Henry Rich; Marmaduke Wyvill	Member of Parliament for Richmond; 1861–1872; With: Marmaduke Wyvill to 1865; John Dundas 1865–1866; Marmaduke Wyvill from 1866	Succeeded by Lawrence Dundas
Legal offices
Preceded by Sir William Atherton	Solicitor General for England and Wales; 1861–1863	Succeeded by Sir Robert Collier
Preceded by Sir William Atherton	Attorney General for England and Wales; 1863–1866	Succeeded by Sir Hugh Cairns
Preceded by	Judicial Committee of the Privy Council; 1872–1895	Succeeded by
Political offices
Preceded by The Lord Hatherley	Lord High Chancellor of Great Britain; 1872–1874	Succeeded by The Lord Cairns
Preceded by The Earl Cairns	Lord High Chancellor of Great Britain; 1880–1885	Succeeded by The Lord Halsbury
Academic offices
Preceded by Arthur Penrhyn Stanley	Rector of the University of St Andrews; 1877–1880	Succeeded by Sir Theodore Martin
Peerage of the United Kingdom
New creation	Earl of Selborne; 1882–1895	Succeeded by William Palmer
New creation	Baron Selborne; 1872–1895	Succeeded by William Palmer
