= Robert Collier, 2nd Baron Monkswell =

British Liberal politician

The Right Honourable The Lord Monkswell
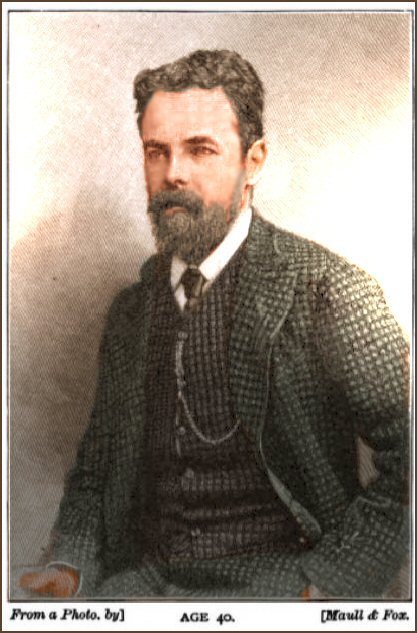
- Lord Monkswell, 1885

Under-Secretary of State for War
- In office 5 January 1895 – 21 June 1895
- Monarch: Victoria
- Prime Minister: The Earl of Rosebery
- Preceded by: The Lord Sandhurst
- Succeeded by: Hon. St John Brodrick

Personal details
- Born: 26 January 1845
- Died: 22 December 1909 (aged 64)
- Party: Liberal
- Spouse(s): Mary Josephine Hardcastle (d. 1930)

Robert Collier, 2nd Baron Monkswell (26 March 1845 – 22 December 1909), was a British Liberal politician. He was briefly Under-Secretary of State for War under The Earl of Rosebery in 1895. As a young man, he was a first-class cricketer active from 1866 to 1867. He was born and died in Chelsea.

== Background ==
Monkswell was the eldest son of Robert Collier, 1st Baron Monkswell, and his wife Isabella Rose, daughter of William Rose. The artist John Collier was his younger brother. He was educated at Eton College, and matriculated at Trinity College, Cambridge in 1863, graduating LL.B. in 1867. He was admitted to the Inner Temple in 1864, and called to the bar in 1869.

== Cricket career ==
Monkswell did not succeed to his title until 1886 and so was known as Robert Collier during his cricket career. He appeared for Cambridge Town Club (aka Cambridgeshire) in three first-class matches, scoring 33 runs with a highest score of 14.

== Political career ==
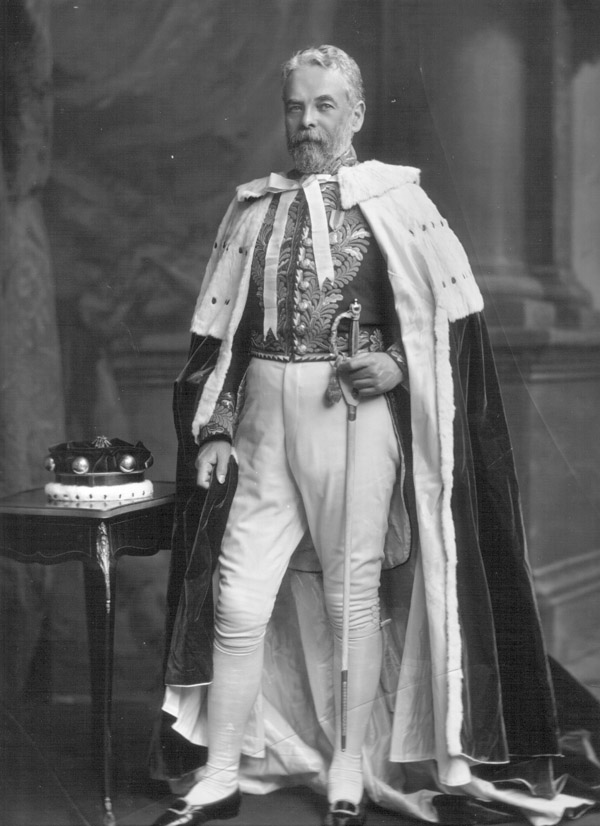
2nd Baron Monkswell, photographed on 28 July 1902.

Lord Monkswell entered the House of Lords on his father's death in 1886, and later served in the Liberal administrations of William Ewart Gladstone and Lord Rosebery as a Lord-in-waiting from 1892 to 1895 and as Under-Secretary of State for War from January to June 1895. He was also a member of the London County Council for the Progressive Party, and served as vice-chairman 1902–03, and Chairman 1903–04.

== Family ==
Lord Monkswell married Mary Josephine Hardcastle, daughter of Joseph Hardcastle, in 1873. He died in December 1909, aged 64, and was succeeded in the barony by his eldest son Robert.

Lady Monkswell is known as a diarist. Her journals were published as A Victorian Diarist: Extracts from the Journals of Mary, Lady Monkswell, 1873–1895 (1944) and A Victorian Diarist: Later Extracts from the Journals of Mary, Lady Monkswell, 1895–1909 (1946). She died on 14 May 1930.

== Arms ==
Coat of arms of Robert Collier, 2nd Baron Monkswell
Crest A demiman affronttee Proper holding in the dexter hand an oak branch slipped and leaved Proper fructed Or and resting the sinister hand on an escutcheon Azure charged with two keys saltirewise Or. Escutcheon Argent on a chevron Azure between in chief two demi-unicorns courant and in base an elephant's head erased Gules three oak branches slipped leaved and fructed Or. Supporters Two druids vested Argent wreathed about the temples with laurel leaves Vert each resting the exterior hand on an escutcheon Azure charged with a balance suspended Or. Motto Persevere

== Notes ==
Political offices
Preceded by The Earl of Romney	Lord-in-waiting; 1892–1895	Succeeded by The Earl Granville
Preceded by The Lord Sandhurst	Under-Secretary of State for War; January–June 1895	Succeeded by Hon. St John Brodrick
Preceded by Andrew Mitchell Torrance	Chairman of the London County Council; 1903 – 1904	Succeeded by John Benn
Peerage of the United Kingdom
Preceded by Robert Monkswell	Baron Monkswell; 1886–1909	Succeeded by Robert Collier
