= John Collier (MP) =

British politician

John Collier (2 March 1769 – 28 February 1849) was a British politician.

Born in Plymouth, Devon, Collier followed his father in becoming a merchant. He was brought up in the Society of Friends, but was ejected while in his youth, for disobeying the group's rules. Despite this, he retained many Quaker beliefs, and refused to invest in privateers. While young, he was said to be the first man in Plymouth to wear his hair short, which was generally thought to be a sign of sympathy for the French Revolution.

By the 1830s, Collier lived at Grimstone Hall in Devon. He was a shipowner, a Lloyd's agent, and also the vice-consul for Portugal at Plymouth. He strongly backed the Reform Act 1832, organising large meetings in its support, and as a consequence, at the 1832 UK general election, he was elected as a Whig for the constituency of Plymouth. In Parliament, he supported shorter Parliamentary terms, secret ballots, and the abolition of monopolies. He held his seat at the 1835 and 1837 UK general elections, then stood down in 1841.

Collier also served as an alderman in Plymouth for many years, up until his death in 1849. In his spare time, he enjoyed shooting and fishing.

Parliament of the United Kingdom
Preceded by George Cockburn; Thomas Byam Martin	Member of Parliament for Plymouth; 1832–1841; With: Thomas Bewes	Succeeded by Hugh Fortescue; Thomas Gill
