= Magdalen Ground =

Cricket ground

- Interactive map of Magdalen Ground

Ground information
- Location: Oxford, Oxfordshire
- Country: England
- Coordinates: 51.7435°N 1.2295°W
- Establishment: 1829
- Owner: University of Oxford

Team information
Oxford University	(1829–1912)
- As of 14 March 2013; Source: Ground profile

The Magdalen Ground (also known as the Old Magdalen Ground) was a cricket ground in Oxford, England. The ground was owned by the University of Oxford and used by Magdalen College, a constituent college of the University of Oxford. Originally forming the northern point of Cowley Marsh, the ground was initially associated with the Magdalen College School, whose students played cricket there. By 1829, the Oxford University Cricket Club had been given a part of the marsh where the College School played cricket. In 1851, it was purchased at auction by the University of Oxford and leased to the University Cricket Club. The ground operated as a first-class cricket venue from 1829 to 1880, hosting 69 first-class matches. The University Cricket Club left the ground following the 1880 season to play at the University Parks from 1881.

== History ==
=== Background ===
Cricket had been played by students at the University of Oxford since at least 1764, by members of the Bullingdon Club on their Bullingdon Green ground. However, the hosting of cricket matches became less favourable at Bullingdon Green, given its relative remoteness from Oxford and its reputation for unsupervised social gatherings, to which playing cricket was secondary. The distance and a serious need to focus on cricket necessitated the requirement for a cricket ground closer to Oxford. The land on which the Magdalen Ground is situated was formerly part of Cowley Marsh. Cricket was first played there when the Reverend H. Jenkins of the Magdalen College School took his students there to play cricket. By 1829, he had handed over part of the ground to the Oxford University Cricket Club, and the Magdalen Ground was established; the College School still continued to play at the ground alongside the University Club for a number of years after; hence, it is from the school that the ground takes its name, and not Magdalen College.

=== First-class venue ===
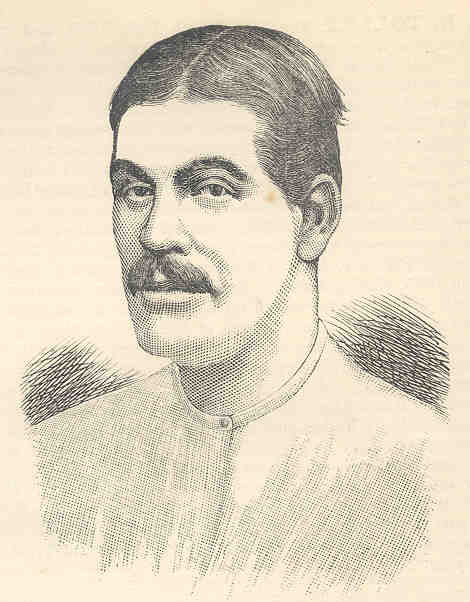
Fred Morley (sketched) took match figures of 13 for 14 at the ground in 1877.

First-class cricket was first played at the ground in the second playing of The University Match between Oxford University and Cambridge University in 1829, which Oxford won by 115 runs. The Marylebone Cricket Club (MCC) first played at the ground in 1832, with a side that featured Jem Broadbridge, William Lillywhite, and Ned Wenman. This match marked the beginning of the MCC's long association with the Magdalen Ground, typically playing a "grand match" there against Oxford annually until 1880. Neither the College School nor the University Cricket Club formerly owned the land, which by 1850 remained a part of Cowley Marsh. Under an Enclosure Act, the land which made up Cowley Marsh was put up for auction by the Parish of Cowley. It was purchased under the Vice-Chancellorship of Frederick Charles Plumptre for the University of Oxford, with an Act of Convocation dated 30 May 1851 authorising the purchase for the special purpose of enabling members of the university to play cricket. The following month, an agreement was signed between Plumptre and William Ridding, steward of the University Cricket Club, to let the ground to the cricket club, enabling them to become permanent lessees of an enclosed cricket ground; this began a trend for other colleges to become lessees of their own enclosed grounds within Oxford.

The most famous first-class match held on the ground came in 1877 when Oxford played the MCC. Played before a large crowd and fair, but cold, weather, Oxford won the toss and elected to bat. They were dismissed for 12 runs in 43.2 four ball overs in their first innings, which remains the second lowest first-class score of all time; Fred Morley, who would go on to play Test cricket for England, took figures of 7 for 6 in the Oxford first innings and figures of 6 for 8 in their second innings. His return of 13 for 14 remains the most outstanding match analysis of all time.

By the 1870s, it was an opinion amongst Oxford cricketers that the cricket facilities at the University of Cambridge, with their ground at Fenner's, were better than those that Oxford possessed at the Magdalen Ground; the pavilion at the Magdalen Ground dated from its foundation and did not afford the comforts and conveniences expected of a modern cricket facility of the time. Ranjitsinhji described the turf at the ground as "magnificent", but that it required fine weather to remain so; with the Oxford cricket season being played mostly in the spring, the ground was often wet and flooding could occur; the 1843 University Match had to be moved to Bullingdon Green due to this problem. Chief amongst complaints from students was that they found the location of the ground was inconveniently situated from the main buildings of the university. Therefore, with the encouragement of the Vice-Chancellor The Reverend Evan Evans, a petition was started by Thomas Case (then treasurer of the University Cricket Club) for the cricket club to move to a new ground in the north of Oxford at the University Parks. This was realised in 1881, when the cricket club left the Magdalen Ground for the University Parks. Up until that point, the ground had played host to 69 first-class matches. One further first-class match, in 1912 against the South Africans, was played at the Magdalen Ground.

=== Later use ===
After the departure of the University Cricket Club, minor matches continued to be played by Magdalen Cricket Club and Cowley St. John Cricket Club. In the 1890s, the ground was a venue for inter–college football matches. During the First World War, there were talks to turn the ground over to agricultural use to help negate the growing food shortages caused by the German policy of unrestricted submarine warfare. To this end, negotiations with the local allotment association began at the beginning of 1917, with the ground being acquired by the Oxford Land Cultivation Committee in February 1917. The tenancy of the Oxford Land Cultivation Committee expired in March 1923, with the ground subsequently being built over by residential housing later in the 1920s.

== Records ==
=== First-class ===
- Highest team total: 439 all out by Oxford University v Marylebone Cricket Club, 1864
- Lowest team total: 12 all out by Oxford University v Marylebone Cricket Club, 1877
- Highest individual innings: 142 by James Round for Southgate v Oxford University, 1867
- Best bowling in an innings: 8/22 by George Wootton for Marylebone Cricket Club v Oxford University, 1868
- Best bowling in a match: 15/98 by Robert Henderson for Gentlemen of England v Oxford University, 1877
