= Baily's Monthly Magazine of Sports and Pastimes, and Racing Register =

Baily's Monthly Magazine of Sports and Pastimes, and Racing Register, from 1889 Baily's Magazine of Sports and Pastimes, was a monthly sports magazine that included cricket, horse racing and other equine pursuits, tennis. It was first published in 1860 by A.H. Baily & Company of Cornhill, London, until it was taken over by Vinton & Company in 1889. It ceased publication in 1926.

An Index, History and Bibliography of 390 pages, compiled by Chris Harte was published in 2017.
