= William Ridding (cricketer) =

English cricketer and cleric

Personal information
- Full name: William Ridding
- Born: 23 November 1830; Winchester, Hampshire, England
- Died: 1 May 1900 (aged 69); Upper Clapton, London, England
- Batting: Right-handed
- Role: Wicketkeeper
- Relatives: Charles Ridding (brother); Arthur Ridding (brother)

Domestic team information
- Years: Team
- 1861: Hampshire (pre-county club)
- 1849–1851: Marylebone Cricket Club
- 1849–1853: Oxford University

William Ridding (23 November 1830 – 1 May 1900) was an English cleric and cricketer. He was a right-handed batsman who played primarily as a wicketkeeper.

== Life ==
The son of Charles Henry Ridding, he was educated at Winchester College, where he represented the college cricket team, and New College, Oxford, where he matriculated in 1848 and graduated M.A. in 1856. He became vicar of Meriden, then in Warwickshire.

Ridding died at Upper Clapton, County of London on 1 May 1900.

== Cricketer ==
Ridding made his debut for Oxford University against the Marylebone Cricket Club in 1849. From 1849 to 1853, he played for the University 10 times, with his final appearance for the university coming against the Marylebone Cricket Club in 1853. In his 10 matches for the university, Ridding scored 268 runs at a batting average of 20.61, with two half centuries and highest score of 53.

In 1849, he made his debut for the Marylebone Cricket Club against Sussex. In 1851, he played his second and final match for the club against Sussex.

Ridding represented Hampshire in a single match against the Marylebone Cricket Club in 1861. As well as play for the above teams, he also represented the Gentlemen of England, and the Gentlemen in the 1849 and 1850 Gentlemen v Players matches. Ridding also played a number of non matches for Oxfordshire.

In his overall career he scored 326 runs at an average of 15.52, with two half centuries and a highest score of 53. Behind the stumps he took 9 catches and made 17 stumpings.

== Family ==
Ridding's brothers, Charles Ridding and Arthur Ridding both played. Another brother, George Ridding, was a headmaster and first Bishop of Southwell.

Ridding married in 1858 Caroline Selina Caldecott, daughter of Charles M. Caldecott of Holbrook Grange, Warwickshire. Their daughter Mary Ridding became a Sanskrit and Pali scholar and translated Banabhatta's Kadambari into English.
