= Lady Laura Ridding =

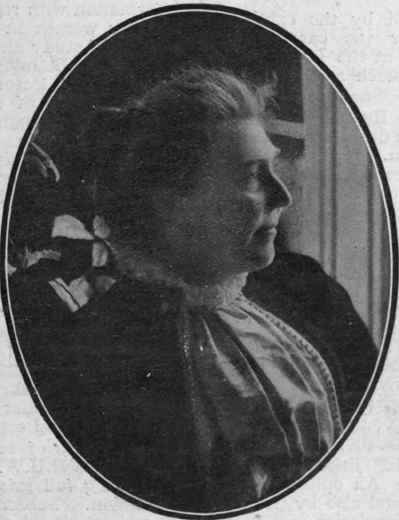
- by Ernest Mills
- Born: 26 March 1849; Harley Street, London, England
- Died: 22 May 1939 (aged 90); Wonston, Hampshire, England
- Known for: President of the National Union of Women Workers
- Spouse: George Ridding

Lady Laura Elizabeth Ridding (née Palmer; 26 March 1849 – 22 May 1939) was a British biographer, suffragist and philanthropist.

== Life ==
Ridding was born in Harley Street. Her father, Roundell Palmer, 1st Earl of Selborne, had married Lady Laura Waldegrave, daughter of William Waldegrave, 8th Earl Waldegrave, in 1848. They had five children and she was their eldest.

In 1876 she married George Ridding, the first bishop of Southwell, and became known as Lady Laura Ridding.

In 1895 she founded the National Union of Women Workers at a conference in Nottingham that she had organised. She founded the organisation with the writer Louise Creighton and the administrator Emily Janes. Although it was called a union its purpose was to co-ordinate the voluntary efforts of women across Great Britain. It said that it would "promote sympathy of thought and purpose among the women of Great Britain and Ireland". Creighton became the first President and in time Ridding would also serve.

Ridding joined with Katherine Twining (1857-1943) to promote the need for qualified midwives to attend women in rural areas, both delivering papers on this at the Norwich conference in 1898.

Ridding wrote five biographies, the first three volumes were for her husband. She then wrote a biography of her nephew Robert Palmer and a fifth about her sister Laura Palmer.

Ridding moved to the rectory in Wonston in 1904 and died there in 1939.

== Works ==
- George Ridding, schoolmaster and bishop
- 43rd head of Winchester, 1866–1884
- first bishop of Southwell, 1884–1904 (1908)
- The Life of Robert Palmer, 1888–1916 (1921)

Non-profit organization positions
Preceded by ?	President of the National Union of Women Workers; 1910–1911	Succeeded by Mrs Alan Bright
