= George Ridding =

- Bishop of Southwell
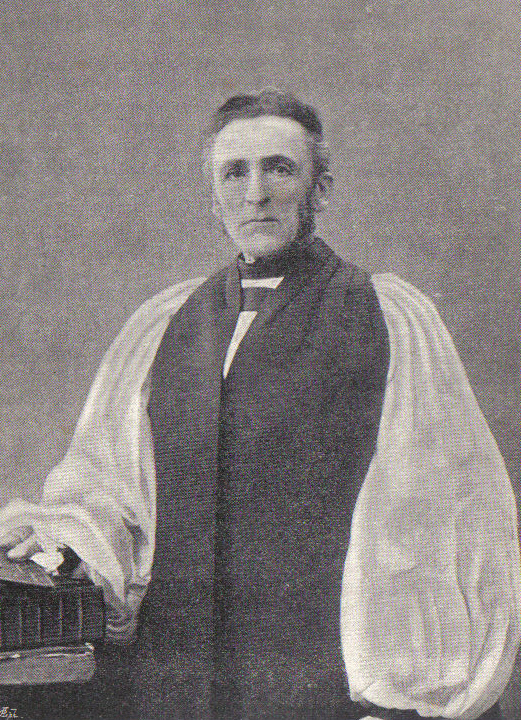
- George Ridding from the Illustrated Guide to the Church Congress (1897)
- Church: Church of England
- Diocese: Southwell and Nottingham
- In office: 1884-1904
- Predecessor: first postholder
- Successor: Edwyn Hoskyns

Orders
- Ordination: 1854 (deacon); 1856 (priest); by Bishop of Oxford
- Consecration: 1884

Personal details
- Born: 16 March 1828 Winchester, England
- Died: 30 August 1904 (aged 76)
- Denomination: Anglican
- Spouse: Mary Louisa, née Moberly (m. 1857; died 1858); Laura Elizabeth, née Palmer (m. 1876)

George Ridding (16 March 1828 – 30 August 1904) was an English headmaster and bishop.

== Life ==
George Ridding was born on 16 March 1828 at Winchester College, of which his father, the Rev. Charles Ridding, vicar of Andover, was a fellow.

He was educated at Winchester College and at Balliol College, Oxford. He became a fellow of Exeter College, Oxford and was a tutor from 1853 to 1863.

Ridding was ordained as a deacon in 1854. His ordination into priesthood was conducted by the Bishop of Oxford on 20 September 1856 in St John the Baptist Church, Oxford. In 1858 he married Mary Louisa Moberly, second daughter of George Moberly, who died within a year of their marriage.

He was appointed second master of Winchester College in 1863, and on the retirement of his father-in-law he succeeded to the headmastership. The gate between College Meads and Lavender Meads bears his name.

During the tenure of this office (1867–1884) he carried out successfully a series of radical reforms in the organisation of the school, resulting in a great increase both in its reputation and numbers. In 1884, he became the first Bishop of Southwell, and brought his powers of organisation and conspicuous tact and moderation to bear on the management of the new diocese. There is a bronze statue of him in Southwell Minster by F. W. Pomeroy.

He took an active share in educational and social work, and was materially assisted in these respects by his second wife, Lady Laura Palmer, daughter of the 1st Earl of Selborne. He resigned his see a short time before his death. His brothers Charles Ridding and William Ridding were also clergy, while another brother Arthur Ridding was a librarian; all three brothers had played first-class cricket.

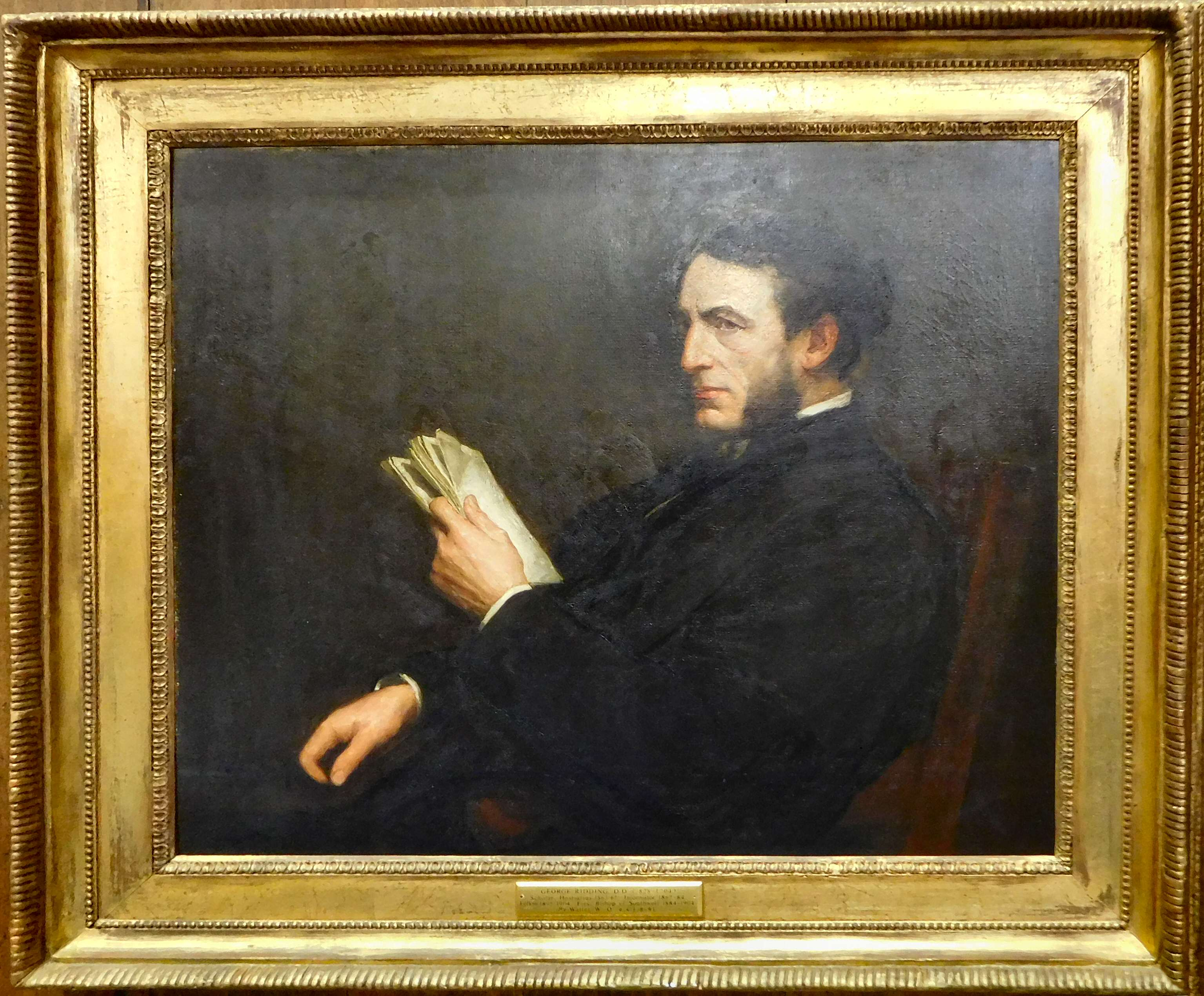
Painting of George Ridding, Headmaster of Winchester College,
by Walter William Ouless

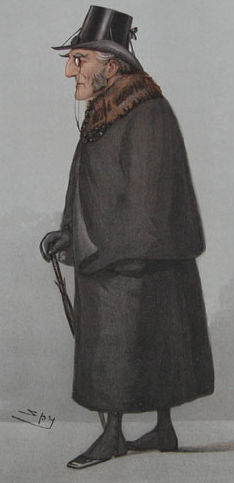
George Ridding, by Leslie Ward, 1901

== Sources ==
Other cited works:

- "George Ridding, first Bishop of Southwell". Church Quarterly Review. 60 (120): 241–285. 1 July 1905.
- Beckett, J.V. (2012). "Dr George Ridding: First Bishop of Southwell, 1884-1904". Transactions of the Thoroton Society of Nottinghamshire. 116.
- Kenyon, F. G.; Curthoys, M. C. "Ridding, George (1828–1904)". Oxford Dictionary of National Biography (online ed.). Oxford University Press. doi:10.1093/ref:odnb/35750. (Subscription, Wikipedia Library access or UK public library membership required.)
  - The first edition of this text is available at Wikisource: "Ridding, George" . Dictionary of National Biography. London: Smith, Elder & Co. 1885–1900.
- Moberly, Charlotte Anne Elizabeth (1911). Dolce Domum: George Moberly (D.C.L., headmaster of Winchester College, 1835-1866, Bishop of Salisbury, 1869-1885), his family and friends. London: John Murray – via Internet Archive.

Church of England titles
Preceded by New diocese	Bishop of Southwell; 1884–1904	Succeeded by Edwyn Hoskyns
Academic offices
Preceded by George Moberly	Headmaster of Winchester College; 1867-1884	Succeeded by William Fearon
