= John Fortescue (historian) =

British military historian

The Honourable Sir John Fortescue KCVO FRHisS
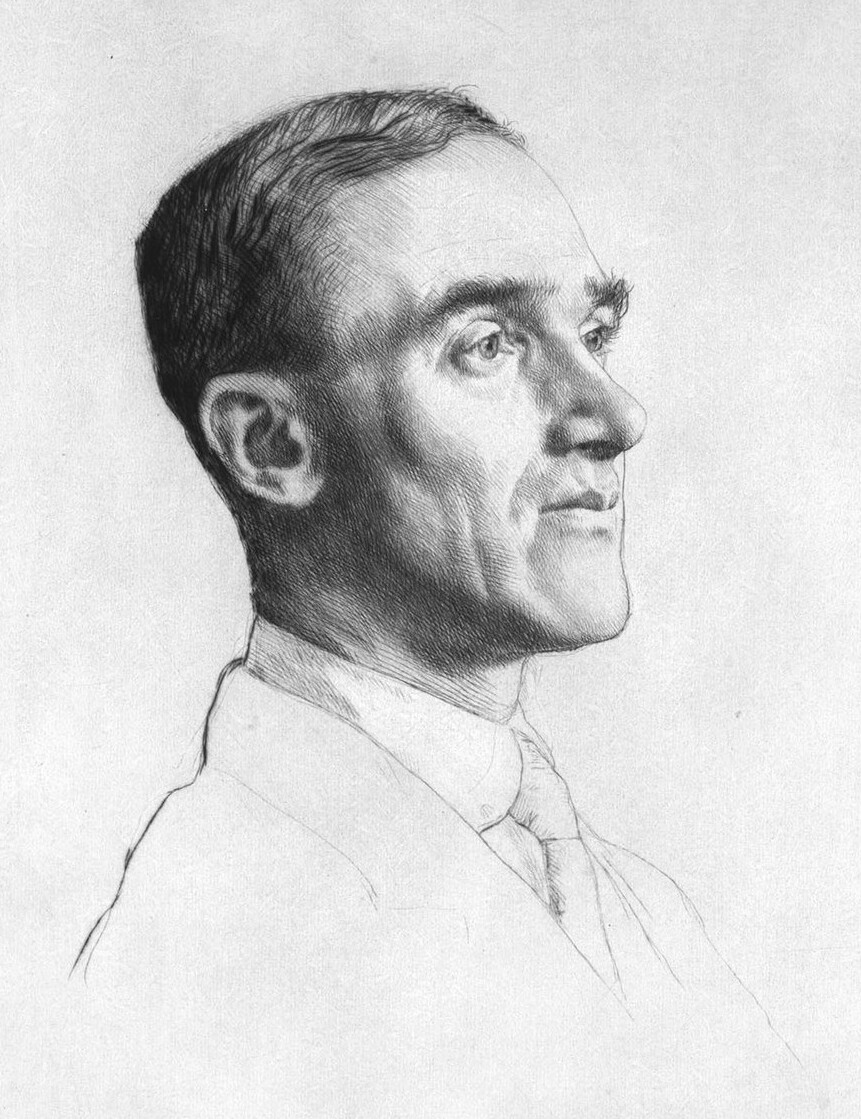
- Born: 28 December 1859
- Died: 22 October 1933 (aged 73)

Fortescue arms

Sir John William Fortescue KCVO FRHistS (28 December 1859 – 22 October 1933) was a British military historian. He was a historian of the British Army and served as Royal Librarian and Archivist at Windsor Castle from 1905 until 1926.

== Early life ==
Fortescue was born on 28 December 1859 in Madeira, the 5th son of Hugh, 3rd Earl Fortescue, by his wife Georgina, Countess Fortescue (née Dawson-Damer). His family owned much of the area around Simonsbath on Exmoor since the twelfth century. Fortescue was educated at Harrow School and Trinity College, Cambridge, later lecturing at Oxford (DLitt (Oxon)).

== Career ==
Fortescue is best known for his major work on the history of the British Army, which he wrote between 1899 and 1930. Between 1905 and 1926, he worked as the Royal Librarian at Windsor Castle.

In 1911, Fortescue delivered the Ford Lectures at Oxford University. In 1920, he delivered the British Academy's Raleigh Lecture on History. He served as president of the Royal Historical Society from 1921 to 1925 and was elected an honorary fellow of Trinity College, Cambridge. From 1926 to 1930 he edited the Soldiers' Tales book series (Peter Davies Limited).

Fortescue was appointed a Member (4th class) of the Royal Victorian Order in the 1907 Birthday Honours, promoted to Commander of the Order (CVO) in the 1917 New Year Honours, and further promoted to Knight Commander of the Order (KCVO) in the 1926 Birthday Honours.

== Personal life ==
In 1914, Fortescue married Winifred Beech, daughter of the Revd Howard Beech, Rector of Great Bealings, Suffolk; they had no children. Lady Fortescue (who died in 1951) was a writer and actress. He died in Cannes on 22 October 1933 at the age of 73.

== Works ==
- John William Fortescue (1895). A History of the 17th Lancers, Duke of Cambridge's Own. Macmillan & Company, Limited.
- Dr John William Fortescue (1895). Dundonald. Macmillan and Co. (English Men of Action)
- J. W. Fortescue (1897). The Story of a Red Deer. [Gutenberg] Macmillan and Co.
- Dr John William Fortescue (1899). The Drummer's Coat. Macmillan.
- John William Fortescue (1899–1930) A History of the British Army (in thirteen volumes, taking the story up to 1870) Available online for downloading
- Dr John William Fortescue (1909). The County Lieutenancies and the Army, 1803–1814. Macmillan and Company, limited.
- J. W. Fortescue (1911). British Statesmen of the Great War, 1793–1814. Oxford, at the Clarendon Press.
- Dr John William Fortescue (1912). The Royal Visit to India 1911–1912. Macmillan and Co.
- Dr John William Fortescue (1916). The Three Pearls. St. Martin's.
- Dr John William Fortescue (1924). My Native Devon. Macmillan and Company, limited.
- Dr John William Fortescue (1925). Wellington. London.
- Sir John William Fortescue (1928). Six British Soldiers. William & Norgate.
- Sir John William Fortescue (1928). The Empire and the Army. Cassell and Company.
- Sir John William Fortescue (1928). Historical and Military Essays. Macmillan and Company, Limited.
- Sir John William Fortescue (1928). A Short Account of Canteens in the British Army. The University Press.
- 1930–1932 Royal Army Service Corps: A History of Transport and Supply in the British Army
- Sir John William Fortescue (1931). Following the Drum. W. Blackwood & sons ltd.
- Sir John William Fortescue (1932). Marlborough. Peter Davies Limited.
- Sir John William Fortescue (1933). Author and curator. W. Blackwood.
- Sir John William Fortescue (1934). The Last Post. W. Blackwood.

== See also ==
- Earl Fortescue

Academic offices
Preceded by Charles Oman	President of the Royal Historical Society; 1921–1925	Succeeded by Thomas Frederick Tout
