= Winifred Fortescue =

British writer and actress (1888–1951)

Winifred Fortescue (7 February 1888 – 9 April 1951) was a British writer and actress. The wife of Sir John Fortescue, librarian and archivist at Windsor Castle and reputed British Army historian, she became formally styled Winifred, Lady Fortescue, when he was knighted in 1926.

== Biography ==
Lady Fortescue (born Winifred Beech in 1888) was a daughter of the Reverend Howard Beech, Rector of Great Bealings (from 1886). She was mainly educated at home, having "outgrown her strength," but when she was 16 her doctor informed her mother that she was suffering from "intellectual starvation." She applied for, and was successful in getting into, Old Cedar House School, Slough. This later transferred to London and became Wentworth Hall, Mill Hill. She then attended F.R. Benson's Dramatic School to train for the stage. She then went on the stage, performing in Sir Herbert Tree's company, and later starring in Jerome K. Jerome's The Passing of the Third Floor Back.

In 1914 she married John Fortescue, despite being 28 years younger than him. She gave up her stage career and took up an interior decorating and dress designing business until illness forced her to give it up. She then began writing for Punch, the Daily Chronicle and The Evening News, and then started a Women's Page for the Morning Post.

In the 1930s Sir John and Lady Fortescue moved to Provence in France, where she began her book writing career with Perfume from Provence. She wrote a number of other books there. Her husband died within 2 years of them moving to France but she stayed on until forced to move out by the German invasion during World War II. She returned at the end of the war and died in Opio, Provence.

== Bibliography ==
- 1935 Perfume from Provence
- 1937 Sunset House
- 1939 There's Rosemary, There's Rue
- 1941 Trampled Lilies
- 1943 Mountain Madness
- 1948 Beauty for Ashes
- 1950 Laughter in Provence
