= Huddleston =

Huddleston is a surname. Notable people with the surname include:

- Alex Huddleston (born 1986), American mixed martial artist
- Amelia Edith Huddleston Barr (1831–1919), British novelist
- Arthur Huddleston (1880–1948), British colonial civil servant
- Bill Huddleston (1873–1962), English cricketer
- David Huddleston (1930–2016), American actor
- David Huddleston (gymnast) (born 2000), Bulgarian gymnast
- David Huddleston (Canadian general), Commander, Air Command from 1991 to 1993
- David Winfield Huddleston (born 1943), American minister and author
- Deserie Huddleston (born 1960), Australian sport shooter
- Eric T. Huddleston (1888–1977), American architect
- Ernest Whiteside Huddleston (1874–1959), Indian Navy officer
- Ferdinand Huddleston (1812–1890), English cricketer
- Floyd Huddleston (1918–1991), American songwriter, screenwriter, and TV producer
- George Huddleston (1869–1960), American Congressman
- George Huddleston Jr. (1920–1971), American Congressman
- Gertie Huddleston (c. 1916–2013), Australian Aboriginal artist
- Henry Batten Huddleston (1864–1944), Indian Defence Force officer
- Holly Huddleston (born 1987), New Zealand cricketer
- Hubert Huddleston (1880–1950), British Army officer
- John Huddleston (disambiguation)
- John Walter Huddleston (1815–1890), English judge
- Lawson Huddleston (1677–1743), English priest
- Mac Huddleston (1943–2023), American politician
- Mark Huddleston, American academic administrator
- Mike Huddleston, American comic book artist
- Nicholas Huddleston (fl. 1404), English politician
- Nigel Huddleston (born 1970), English politician
- Richard Huddleston (disambiguation)
- Robert Huddleston (born 1955), American politician
- Rodney Huddleston (born 1937), English-Australian linguist and grammarian
- Sisley Huddleston (1883–1952), British journalist and writer
- T. F. C. Huddleston (1848–1936), British scholar
- T. J. Huddleston Sr. (1876–1959), African American entrepreneur
- Trevor Huddleston (1913 1998) Anglican bishop best known for his anti-apartheid activism
- Vicki J. Huddleston (born 1942), American diplomat
- Walter Dee Huddleston (1926–2018), American politician
- William Huddleston (disambiguation)
- Willoughby Baynes Huddleston (1866–1953), Royal Indian Marine officer
- William Emanuel Huddleston (1920–2013), American multi-instrumentalist better known as Yusef Lateef

== Huddlestone ==
- James Huddlestone, English rugby league player
- Tom Huddlestone (born 1986), English footballer

== Places ==
=== Australia ===
- Huddleston, South Australia

=== United States ===
- Huddleston, Arkansas
- Huddleston, Missouri
- Huddleston, Virginia

=== England ===
- Huddleston with Newthorpe, a civil parish in Yorkshire

== See also ==
- Hudleston
- Hiddleston
