= List of Old Wykehamists =

List of distinguished people educated at Winchester College

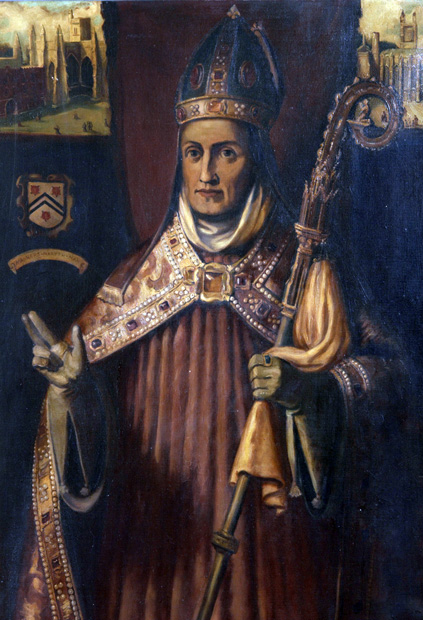
Former pupils of Winchester College are called Old Wykehamists, after the school's founder, William of Wykeham.

Old Wykehamists are former pupils of Winchester College, so called in memory of the school's founder, William of Wykeham. He was Bishop of Winchester and Lord Chancellor of England. He used the wealth these positions gave him to establish both the school in 1382 and a university college, New College, Oxford, in 1379; both of them were set up to provide an education for 70 scholars. Winchester College opened in 1394. William of Wykeham provided that up to two pupils a year who could prove they were his descendants could attend the school at its expense; they were known as Consanguineus Fundatoris, "Founder's Kin". Ranulph Twisleton-Wykeham-Fiennes records that the tradition ended in 1868, by which time fourteen members of his family had received a free education. At first only a small number of pupils other than scholars were admitted; by the 15th century the school had around 100 pupils in total, nominally the 70 scholars, 16 choirboys and the rest "commoners". Demand for places for commoners was high, and though at first restricted, numbers gradually rose. From the 1860s, ten boarding houses, each for up to sixty pupils, were added, greatly increasing the school's capacity. By 2020, the number of pupils had risen to 690.

The school's traditions include a 600-year-old ceremony in which the Warden, wearing the Founder's Ring, admits each new Scholar; "Illumina", an autumn celebration, in which candles are placed into niches all over the medieval walls around the playing fields; and "Morning Hills", held once a year, when all the school's pupils and teachers climb St Catherine's Hill for a roll call and prayers. The Ad Portas ("At the Gates") ceremony is held as an honour for distinguished guests and alumni; all members of the school stand in the medieval Chamber Court to hear the speeches. In 2011, nineteen alumni (and six more honoured in their absence), all Fellows of the Royal Society or Fellows of the British Academy, were welcomed Ad Portas, with speeches in Latin and English.

Among the Old Wykehamists listed here are four archbishops, including one of the school's earliest pupils, Henry Chichele; four field marshals; commanders of both Fighter Command and Bomber Command during the Second World War—Hugh Dowding and Charles Portal, respectively; and two Viceroys of India, Archibald Wavell, who is buried at the College, and Frederic Thesiger. The many politicians include six Chancellors of the Exchequer: Henry Addington for the Tory Party; Robert Lowe for the Liberal Party; Stafford Cripps and Hugh Gaitskell for the Labour Party; and Geoffrey Howe and Rishi Sunak for the Conservative Party. Of these, Addington and Sunak went on to become Prime Minister.

The individuals listed are classified by decade or century of birth, with a note of how each distinguished himself. Those who won military medals are listed at the foot of the page; six Old Wykehamists have won Britain's highest military award, the Victoria Cross. Individuals are included here only if they have distinguished themselves at the highest level within their profession or achieved national recognition. Thus, for example, politicians are included only if they are members of the privy council or have a cabinet position; sportspeople, only if they have distinguished themselves in a national competition or represented their country; for soldiers, that they have reached a rank equivalent to major-general, or won a gallantry award; actors, that they have been nominated for the highest honour in the field, such as an Academy or Olivier Award; members of a profession, that they are recognised as distinguished by their profession's leading institution, such as being a fellow of the Royal Society or the Royal Academy of Music. As another example, national recognition in business means being chair or chief executive of a FTSE 100 company.

== Fourteenth century ==
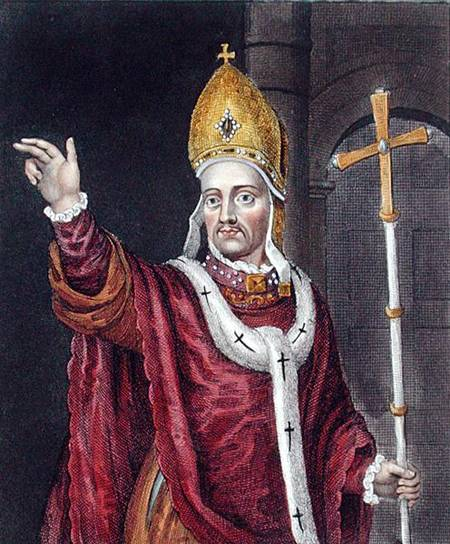
Henry Chichele, Archbishop of Canterbury, taught by Wykeham before the college's foundation

- Henry Chichele, Archbishop of Canterbury (Note: Chichele studied under Wykeham in Winchester, although Winchester College had not yet been founded.)
- Thomas Beckington, statesman

== Fifteenth century ==
- Thomas Chaundler, playwright and illustrator
- John Russell, Lord Chancellor, Bishop of Lincoln
- William Horman, translator
- William Grocyn, scholar
- William Warham, Archbishop of Canterbury, Lord Keeper
- Hugh Inge, Archbishop of Dublin
- Richard Pace, diplomat
- Richard Risby, friar

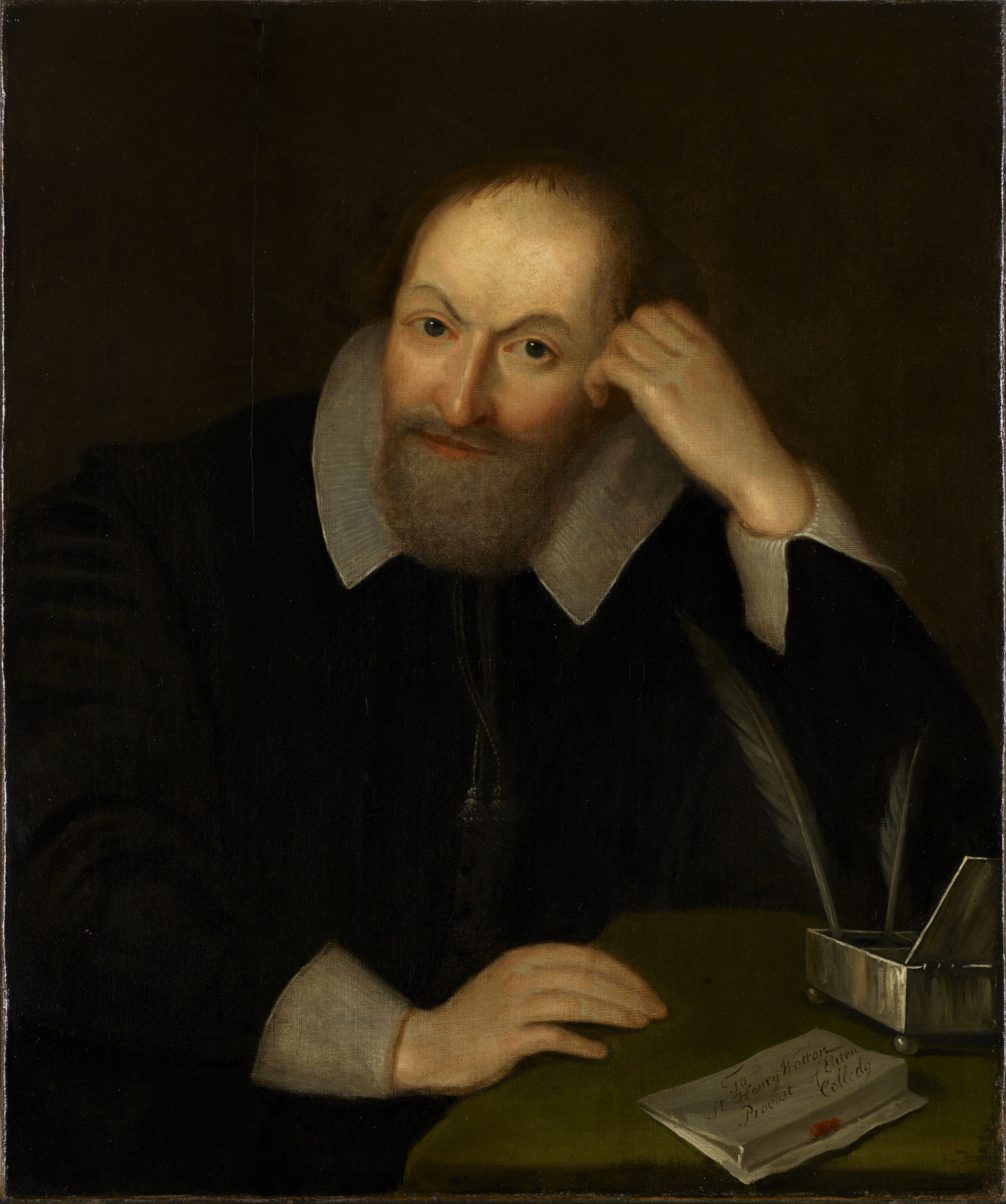
Henry Wotton, ambassador

== Sixteenth century ==
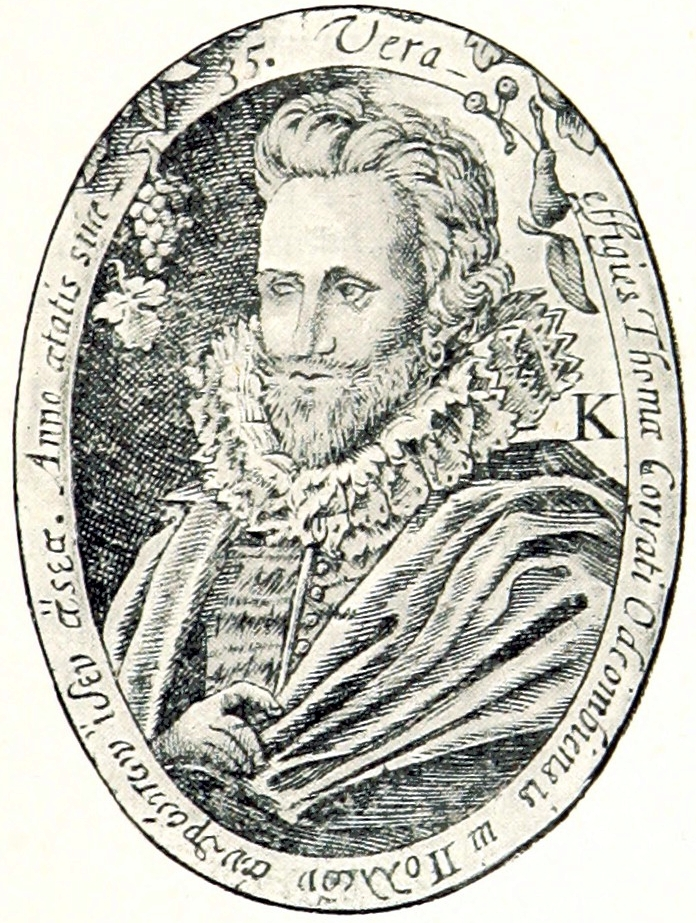
Thomas Coryat, sixteenth century traveller

- Henry Cole, Roman Catholic priest
- Nicholas Udall, Headmaster of Eton and playwright
- Henry Garnet, complicit in the Gunpowder Plot
- John White, bishop
- Nicholas Harpsfield, Roman Catholic apologist
- Richard Reade, Lord Chancellor of Ireland
- Nicholas Sanders, Roman Catholic priest, missionary and historian
- Christopher Johnson, physician, headmaster of Winchester and poet (in Latin)
- Thomas Bilson, bishop
- Thomas Stephens, Jesuit missionary and linguist
- John Harmar, Warden of Winchester College, one of the translators of the Authorised Version of the Bible
- John Owen, Welsh epigrammatist
- Henry Wotton, author and diplomat
- Arthur Lake, bishop
- John Davies, poet
- Thomas James, librarian
- Thomas Coryat, travel writer, court jester to James I
- Henry Marten, Judge of Admiralty
- Thomas Ryves, lawyer
- Richard Zouch, judge and politician
- Edward Nicholas, statesman

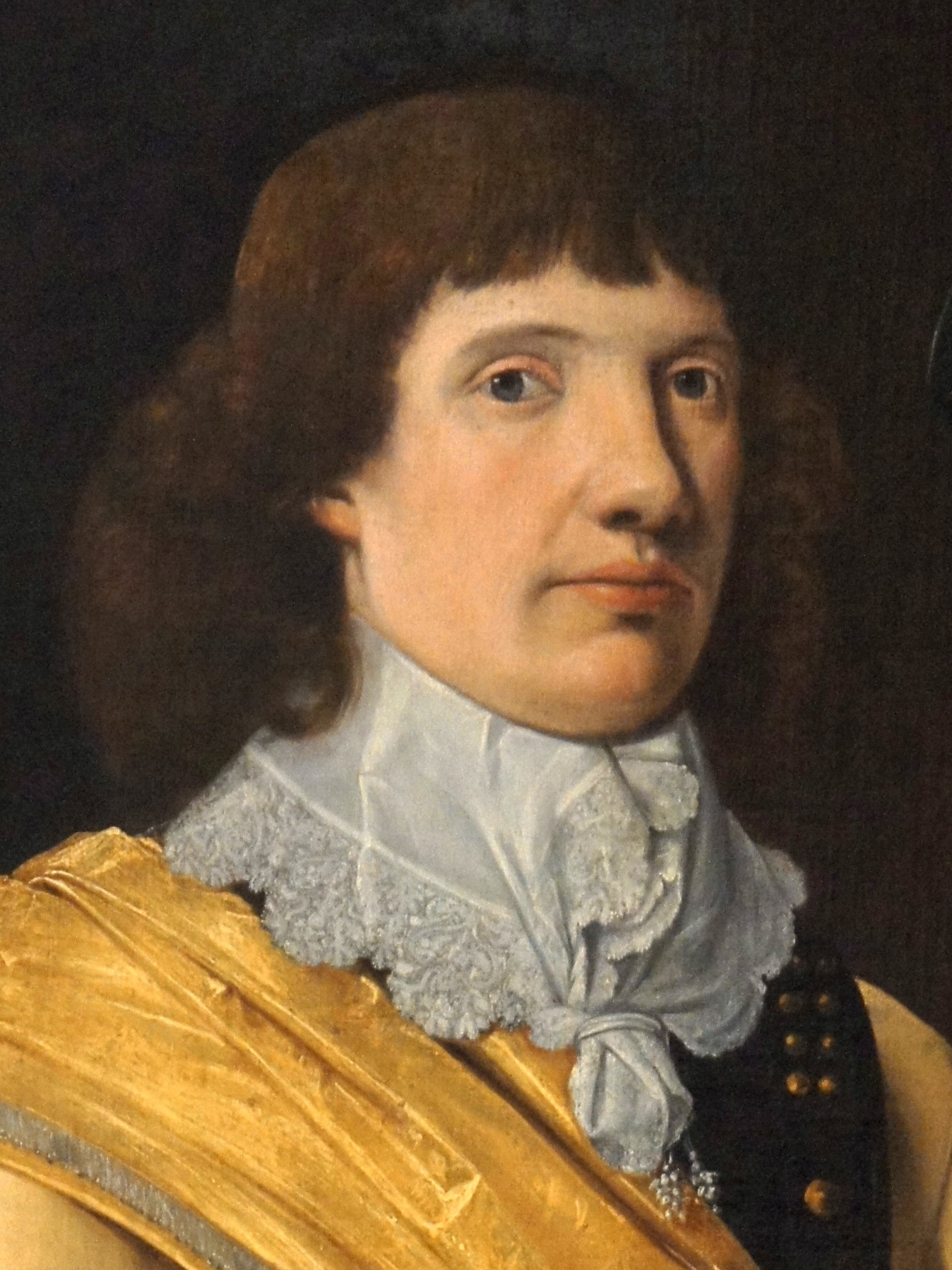
The roundhead Nathaniel Fiennes, a descendant of William of Wykeham

== Seventeenth century ==
- Nathaniel Fiennes, Roundhead politician
- Thomas Ken, bishop, non-juror and hymnwriter
- Francis Turner, bishop and non-juror
- Thomas Otway, dramatist
- Thomas Browne, doctor, polymath, scholar, prose stylist
- Anthony Ashley-Cooper, 3rd Earl of Shaftesbury, politician and author
- William Somervile, poet
- Edward Young, poet

== Eighteenth century ==
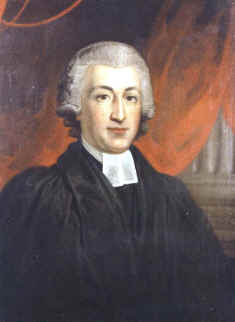
James Woodforde, author of Diary of a Country Parson

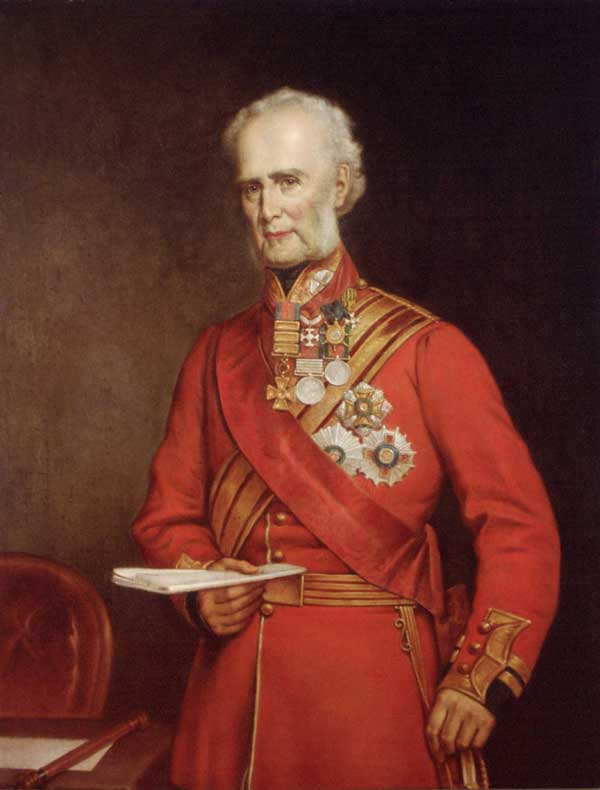
Field Marshal John Colborne

- Robert Lowth, Bishop of London, Hebraist and English grammarian
- William Whitehead, Poet Laureate
- William Collins, poet
- Joseph Warton, literary critic and Headmaster of Winchester
- William Douglas, 4th Duke of Queensberry, nobleman, and a noted gambler
- Thomas Warton, Poet Laureate
- James Eyre, judge
- Charles Wolfran Cornwall, Speaker of the House of Commons
- James Woodforde, clergyman and diarist
- George Isaac Huntingford, Bishop of Hereford and Gloucester
- Thomas Burgess, author
- Henry Addington, 1st Viscount Sidmouth, Prime Minister
- John Hawkins, geologist, traveller, and Fellow of the Royal Society
- William Lisle Bowles, poet who revived the sonnet
- William Howley, Archbishop of Canterbury
- William Sturges Bourne, Tory politician, Home Secretary
- Sydney Smith, essayist and satirist
- Richard Mant, Church of Ireland bishop and writer
- John Colborne, 1st Baron Seaton, Field Marshal and colonial governor
- William Buckland, theologian and geologist
- William Ward, record-scoring cricketer
- Thomas Arnold, headmaster of Rugby
- Walter Farquhar Hook, Tractarian vicar of Leeds
- Thomas Oliphant, musician and lyricist

== Nineteenth century ==
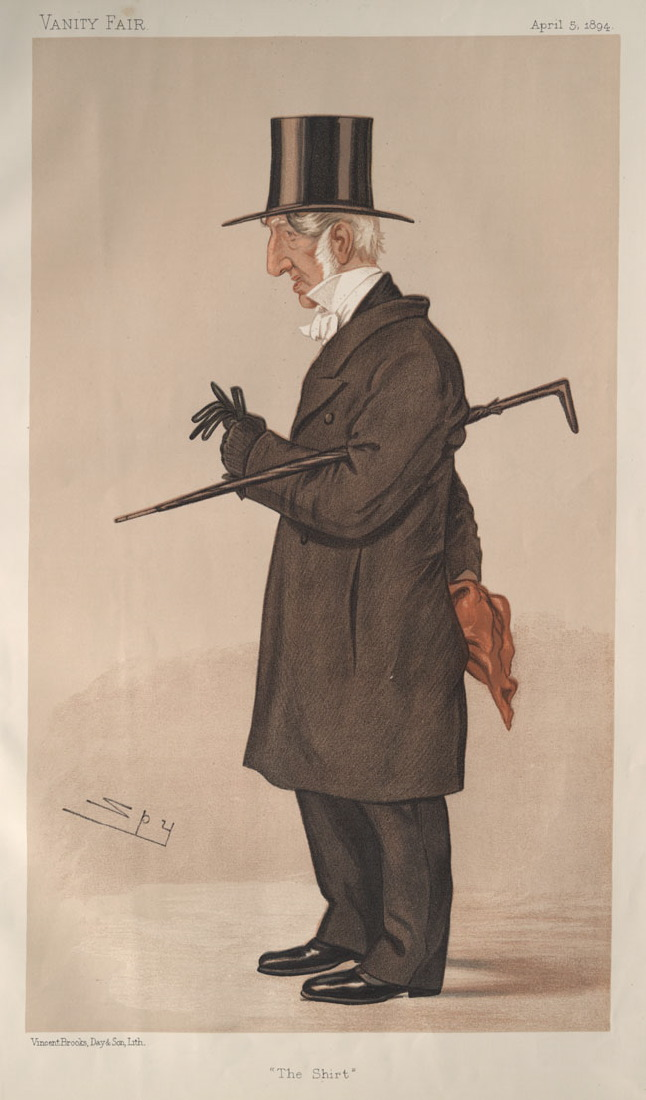
James Edwards Sewell, Warden of New College, caricatured by Spy, 1894

=== 1800–1819 ===
- William Page Wood, 1st Baron Hatherley, Lord Chancellor
- George Moberly, Headmaster of Winchester College, later Bishop of Salisbury
- William Sewell, divine and author
- Christopher Wordsworth, Bishop of Lincoln
- Thomas Adolphus Trollope, author
- James Edwards Sewell, Warden of New College, Oxford.
- Robert Lowe, 1st Viscount Sherbrooke, statesman
- William George Ward, prominent in the Oxford Movement
- William Monsell, 1st Baron Emly, Liberal politician
- Roundell Palmer, 1st Earl of Selborne
- Arthur Farmer, cricketer
- Anthony Trollope, novelist

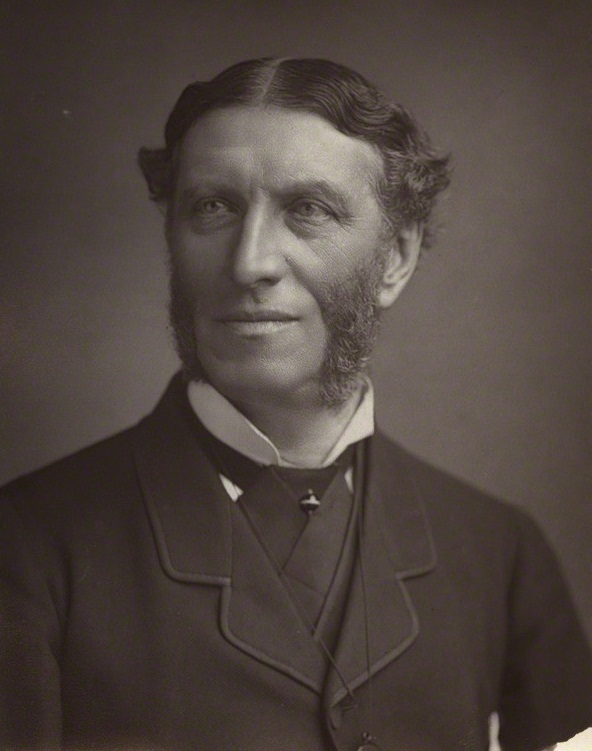
Matthew Arnold, poet

=== 1820–1839 ===
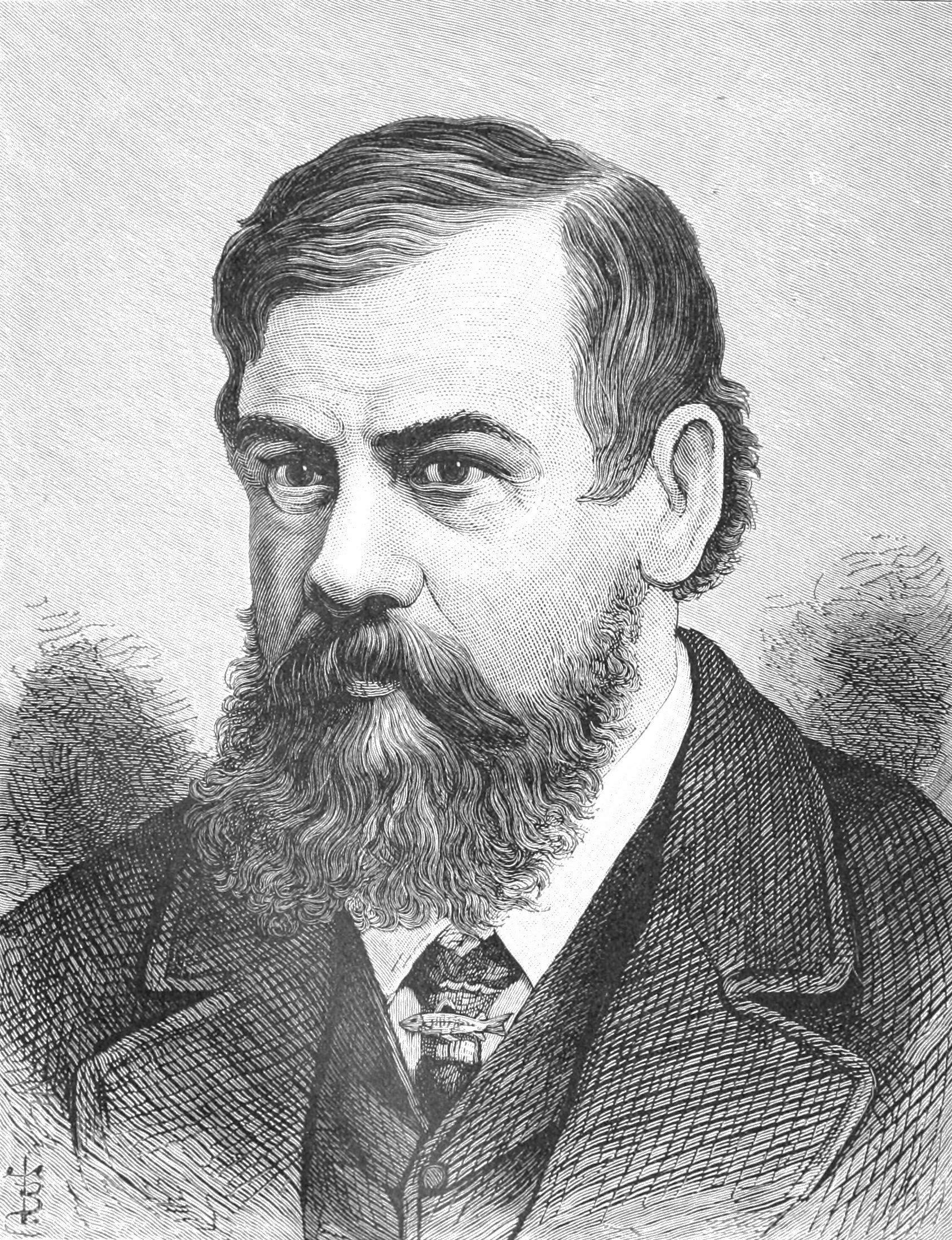
Frank Buckland, naturalist

- William Grasett Clarke, cricketer and clergyman
- Matthew Arnold, poet
- James Freeling, cricketer and clergyman
- Frank Buckland, naturalist
- Arthur Ridding, cricketer, educator and librarian
- George Ridding, Headmaster of Winchester, later Bishop of Southwell
- Henry Furneaux, scholar of Tacitus
- William Tuckwell, Christian socialist clergyman and author of Reminiscences of Oxford
- Samuel Rawson Gardiner, historian
- Richard Bickerton Pemell Lyons, 2nd Baron Lyons, 1st Viscount and Earl Lyons, diplomat
- Philip Lutley Sclater, lawyer, ornithologist (founder of Ibis), zoogeographer, Secretary of the Zoological Society of London for 42 years
- Ford North, Judge of the High Court of Justice and member of the Judicial Committee of the Privy Council
- Ashley Eden, colonial administrator, member of the Council of India
- Cecil Fiennes, cricketer, descendant of William of Wykeham
- Philip Reginald Egerton, founder of Bloxham School
- Arthur Faber, headmaster of Malvern College
- Wingfield Fiennes, cricketer and clergyman, descendant of William of Wykeham

Herbert Stewart fought in the Anglo-Zulu War, the First Boer War and the Sudan Campaign.

=== 1840–1859 ===
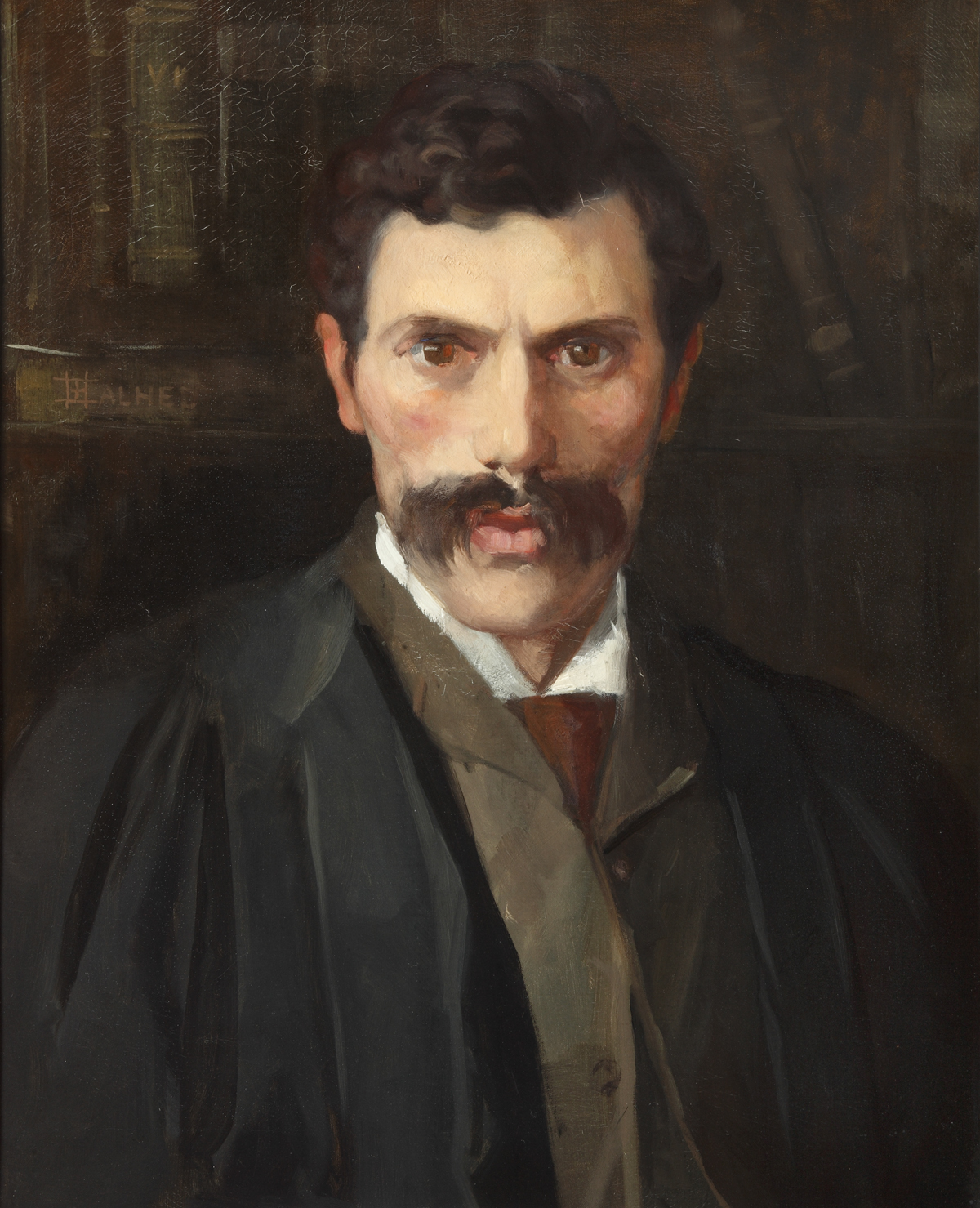
David Samuel Margoliouth, orientalist

- Herbert Stewart, soldier
- Robert Campbell Moberly, theologian
- Samuel Rolles Driver, biblical scholar
- Thomas Hughes, footballer who won the FA Cup twice in the 1870s
- William Lindsay, England footballer and three times FA Cup winner
- Leonard Howell, Wanderers and England footballer
- Charles Marriott, cricketer and barrister
- Francis Birley, footballer who won the FA Cup three times in the 1870s
- Theodore Dyke Acland, physician-in-ordinary to Queen Victoria
- Charles Alfred Cripps, 1st Baron Parmoor, Lord President of the Council
- John Bain, England footballer and 1877 FA Cup Finalist
- John Hewett, Lieutenant Governor of Agra and Oudh
- Ponsonby Ogle, writer and journalist
- Montague John Druitt, suspected of being Jack the Ripper
- David Samuel Margoliouth, orientalist
- G. E. M. Skues, pioneer of fly fishing with nymphs
- William Palmer, 2nd Earl of Selborne, Lord Chancellor
- Percival Parr, footballer and barrister

=== 1860–1869 ===
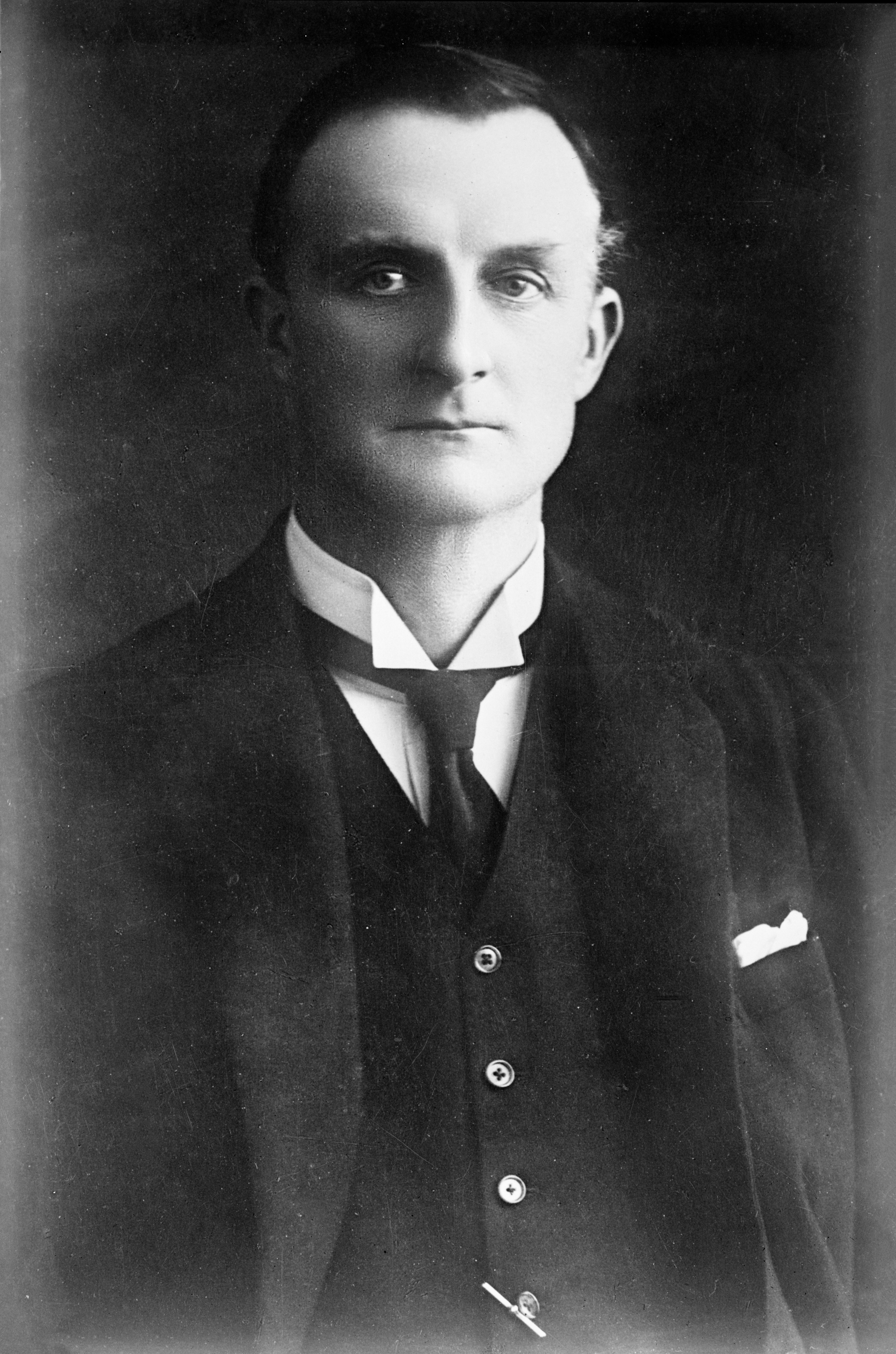
Edward Grey, 1st Viscount Grey of Fallodon, Foreign Secretary, 1914

- Francis J. Haverfield, historian of Roman Britain
- Edward Grey, 1st Viscount Grey of Fallodon, Foreign Secretary 1905–16
- Arthur Cayley Headlam, Principal of King's College London (1903–16) Bishop of Gloucester (1923–45)
- Frederic G. Kenyon, classical scholar
- Robert Laurie Morant, administrator and educator
- Arthur Cobb, wicket-keeper on early tour of America
- John Beresford Leathes, physiologist
- Harold Goodeve Ruggles-Brise, cricketer and soldier
- H. A. L. Fisher, historian, politician
- Arthur Pearson, newspaper magnate, founder of the Daily Express
- Frederic Thesiger, 1st Viscount Chelmsford, Colonial Governor and Viceroy of India
- Claud Schuster, 1st Baron Schuster, Permanent Secretary to the Lord Chancellor 1915–1944
- General Reginald Byng Stephens, soldier
- Ernest Makins, soldier, statesman and politician

=== 1870–1879 ===
Rupert D'Oyly Carte, owner of the D'Oyly Carte Opera Company and Savoy Hotel

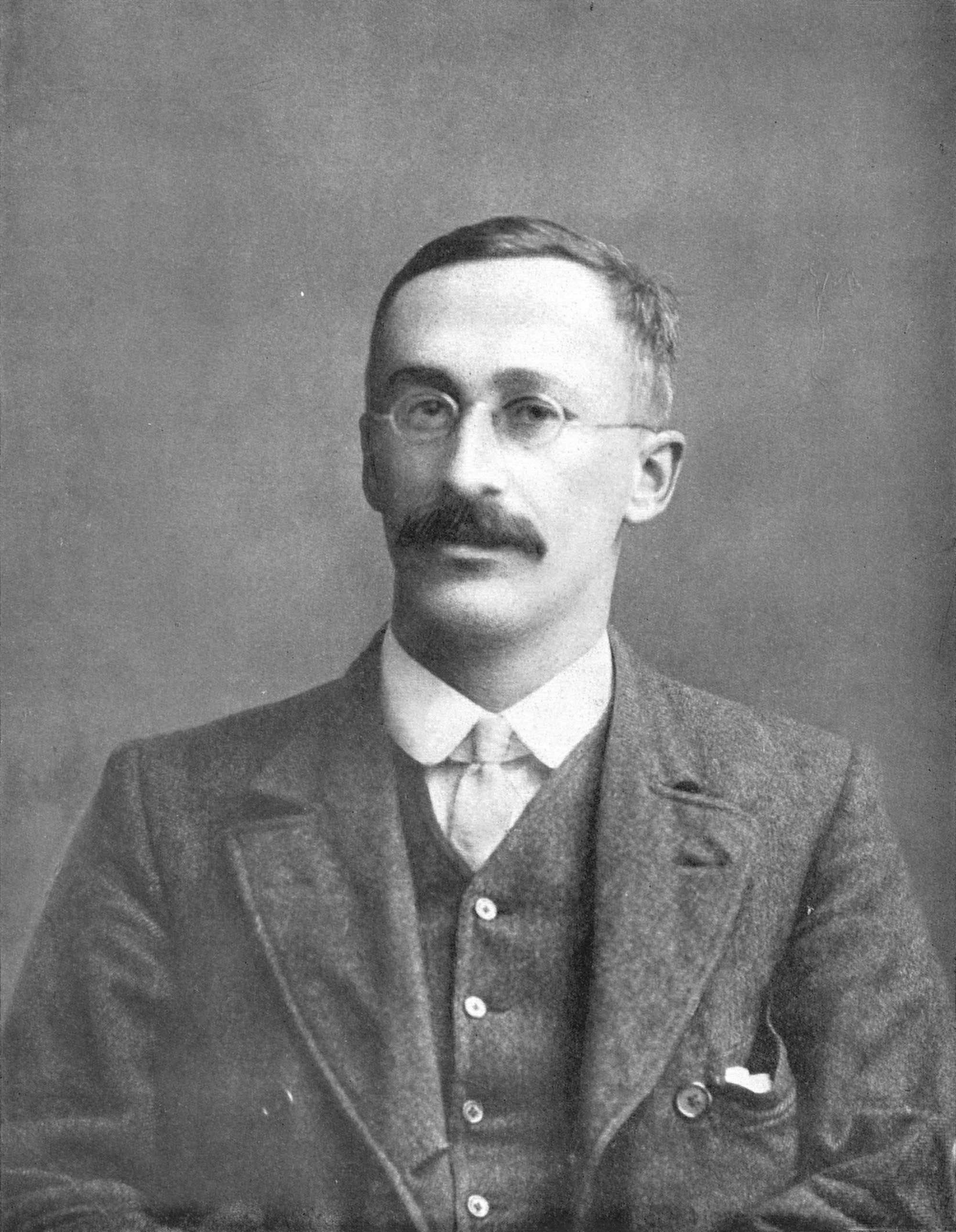
William Sealy Gosset, statistician, inventor of Student's t-test

- Bernard Granville Baker, soldier, author, military artist
- Lord Alfred "Bosie" Douglas, poet and companion of Oscar Wilde
- Edmund Fellowes, musicologist, clergyman
- Udny Yule, statistician
- Edmund Backhouse, "The Hermit of Peking"
- Vyner Brooke, Rajah of Sarawak
- Ewart Grogan, explorer and colonist
- Rupert D'Oyly Carte, Savoy opera producer, hotelier
- William Sealy Gosset, statistician with Guinness (inventor of Student's t-test)
- G. H. Hardy, mathematician and mentor of Ramanujan
- Robert Lock Graham Irving, schoolmaster, writer and mountaineer
- Leopold George Wickham Legg, historian and editor of the Dictionary of National Biography
- Henry Howard, 19th Earl of Suffolk, peer
- Percy Bates, shipbuilder and Inkling
- Warren Fisher, Permanent Secretary of the Treasury, first Head of the Home Civil Service
- Edward Grigg, colonial administrator and politician
- Eric Maclagan, Director of the Victoria and Albert Museum
- Alan Reynolds, cricketer and soldier
- Jack White, trade union organiser, Irish republican and socialist who co-founded the Irish Citizen Army
- Alfred Eckhard Zimmern, Zionist historian and political scientist

=== 1880–1889 ===
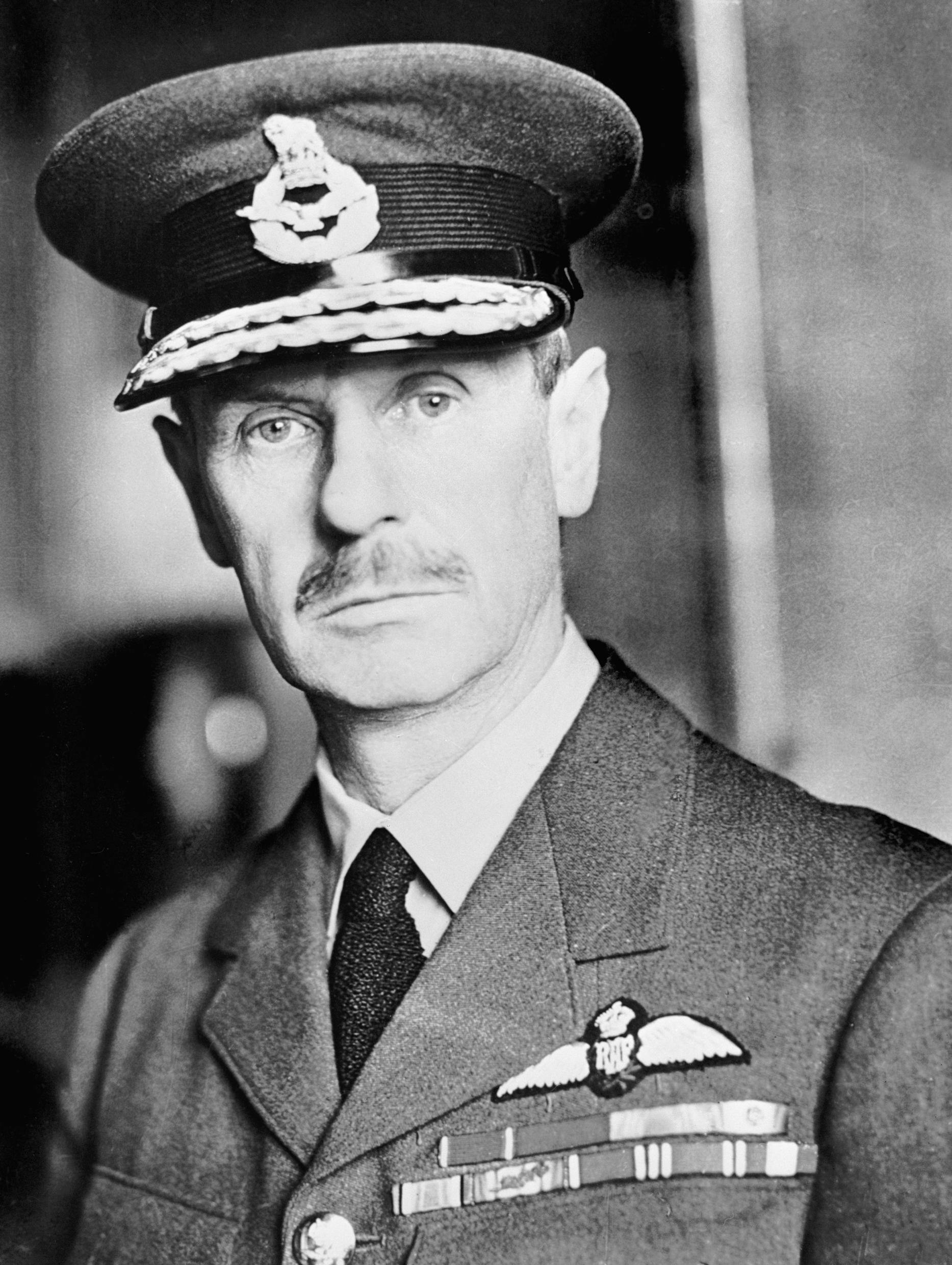
Hugh Dowding led Fighter Command in the Battle of Britain.

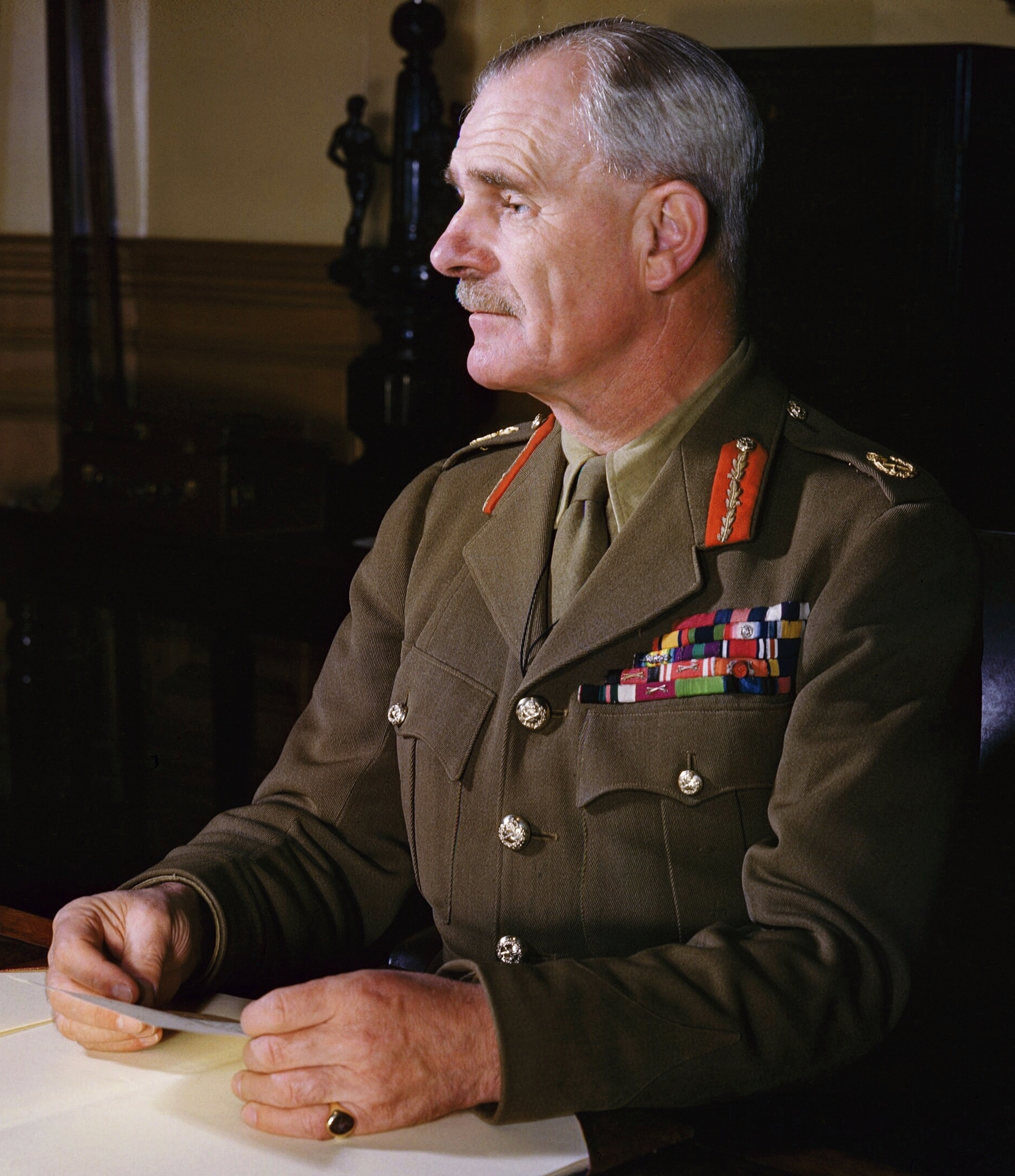
Archibald Wavell, Field Marshal, Viceroy of India

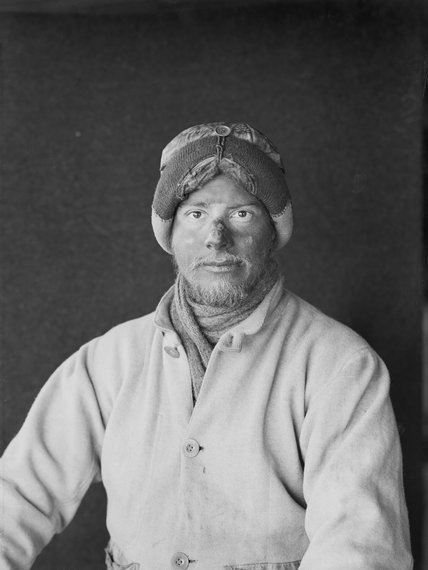
Apsley Cherry-Garrard, Antarctic explorer

- Maurice Bonham-Carter, politician and cricketer
- Walter Henderson, Olympic athlete
- Boyd Merriman, politician
- Hugh Dowding, Battle of Britain commander
- Henry Morshead, Himalayan explorer
- Archibald Wavell, Field Marshal and Viceroy of India
- Adam Fox, theologian and Inkling
- Robert Hamilton Moberly, bishop
- Charles Malan, postmaster-general of the United Provinces
- Clarence Bruce, peer
- George Mallory, mountaineer on first three British expeditions to Mount Everest
- William Reginald Halliday, Principal of King's College London (1928–1952)
- Apsley Cherry-Garrard Member of Captain Scott's expedition of 1912
- Arthur Stanley-Clarke, soldier
- Roundell Palmer, Minister of Economic Warfare
- Basil Brooke, Prime Minister of Northern Ireland
- Charles Bewley, Irish diplomat
- Edmund Morgan, bishop
- James Tucker, judge
- Christopher Dawson, Roman Catholic historian
- Stafford Cripps, Labour politician
- Armstrong Gibbs, composer
- Charles Scott Moncrieff, translator of Proust
- Geoffrey Toye, composer and conductor
- Arnold J. Toynbee, historian
- Ralph H. Fowler, mathematical physicist

=== 1890–1899 ===
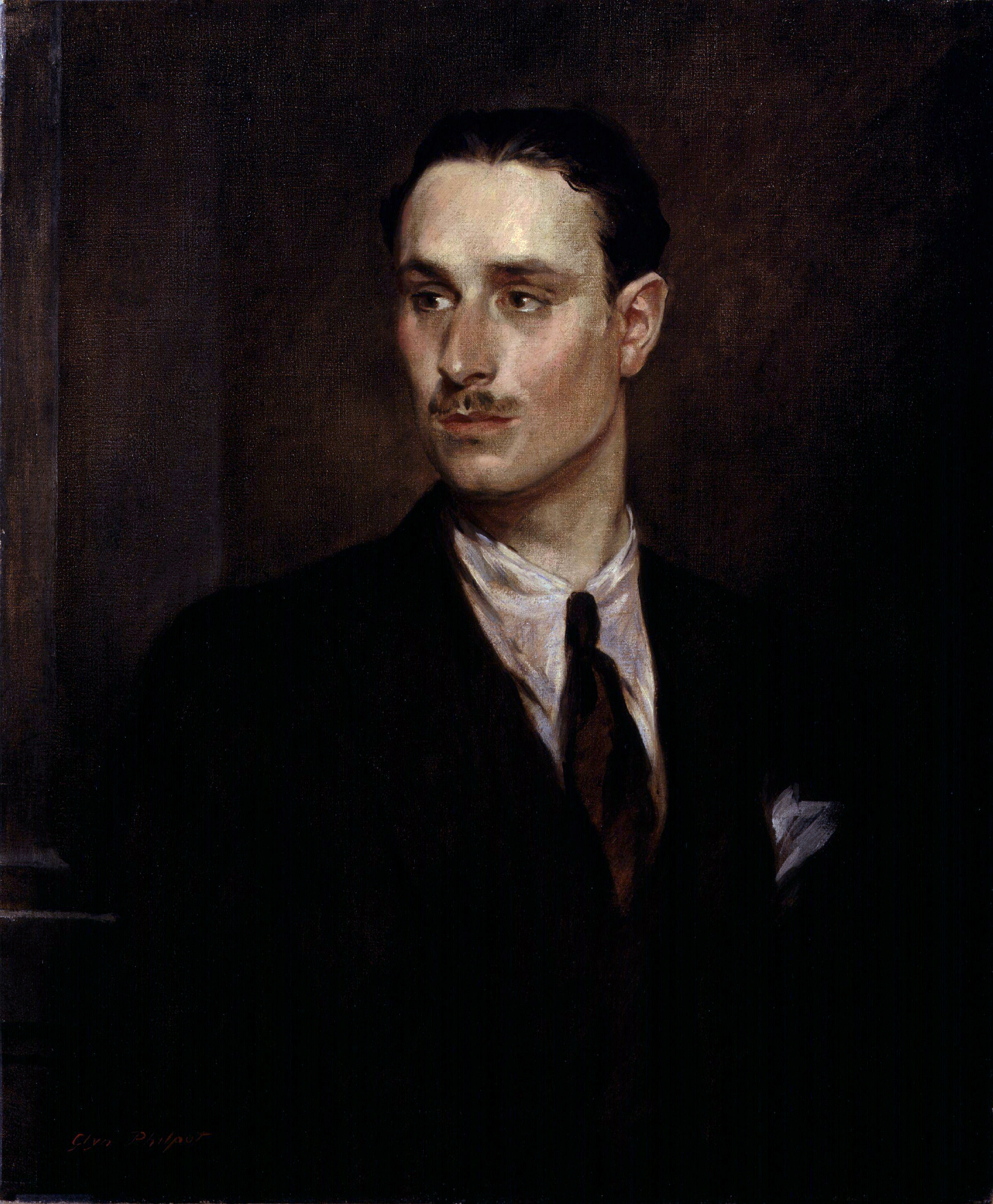
Oswald Mosley, leader of the British Union of Fascists, by Glyn Warren Philpot, 1925

- A. P. Herbert, humorist and law reformer
- John William Fisher Beaumont, Chief Justice of the Bombay High Court
- John Campbell, cardiologist
- Olaf Caroe, writer and colonial administrator
- Spencer Leeson, headmaster and bishop
- Godfrey Rolles Driver, biblical scholar
- Charles Portal, 1st Viscount Portal of Hungerford, Marshal of the Royal Air Force
- Maxwell Woosnam, Olympic and Wimbledon lawn tennis champion and England football captain
- Robert Nichols, war poet
- Malcolm Trustram Eve, 1st Baron Silsoe, barrister
- George MacLeod, Very Rev Lord MacLeod of Fuinary, Moderator, Church of Scotland
- Egon Pearson, statistician
- Gilbert Ashton, cricketer and schoolmaster
- Oswald Mosley, British fascist leader
- Henry Gurney, colonial administrator, assassinated in Malaya
- John Sinclair, former Head of the Secret Intelligence Service (MI6)
- Edward Tennant, war poet
- Ronald Tree, Conservative MP and founder of Sandy Lane, Barbados
- Henry Mond, 2nd Baron Melchett, industrialist
- Gerard Wallop, 9th Earl of Portsmouth, landowner, far-right writer and politician
- Hubert Ashton, footballer, cricketer and politician
- Arthur Norrington, President of Trinity College, Oxford
- H. H. Price, Wykeham Professor of Logic

== Twentieth century ==
=== 1900–1909 ===
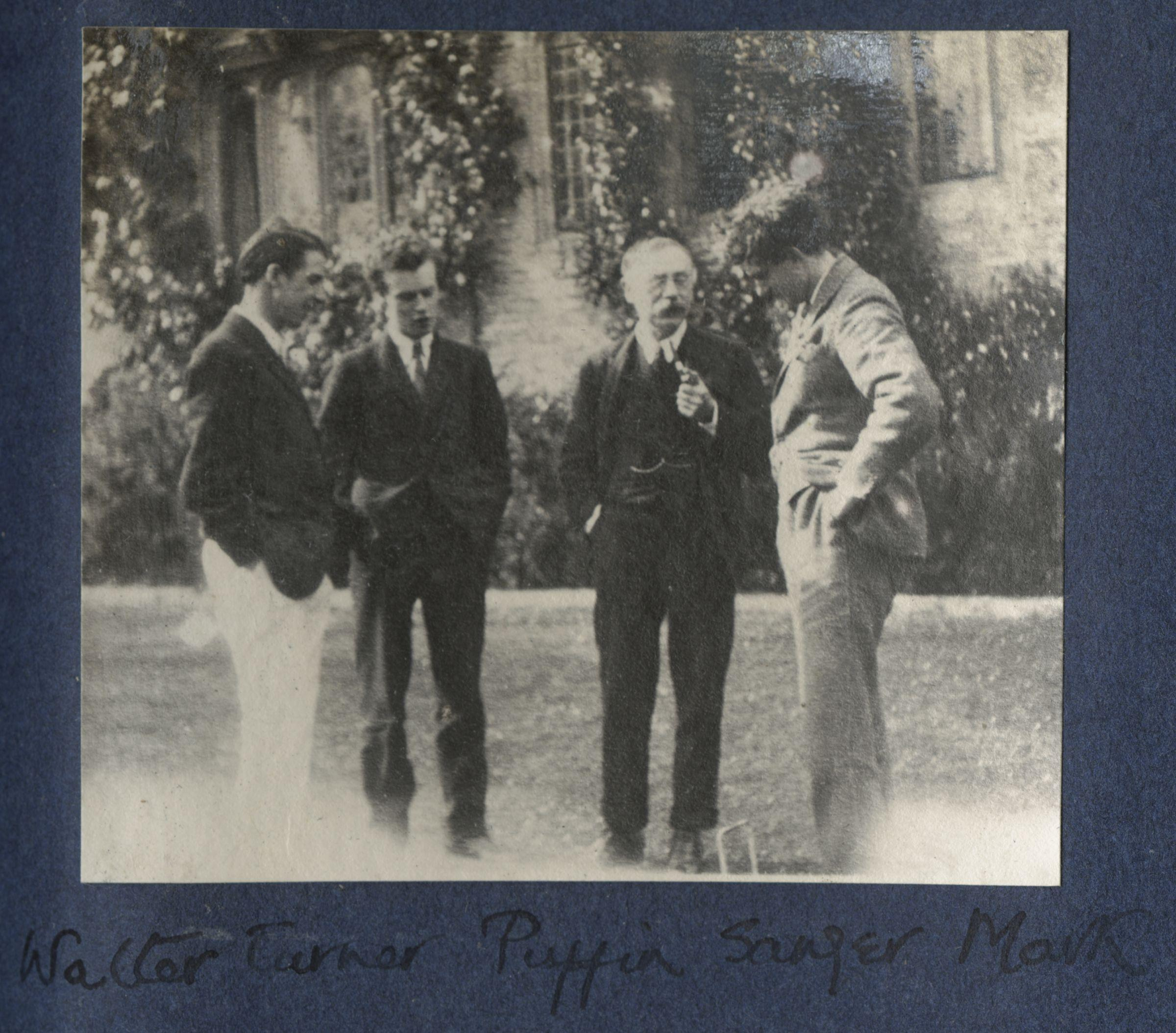
Film director Anthony Asquith (second from left) by Lady Ottoline Morrell (died 1938)

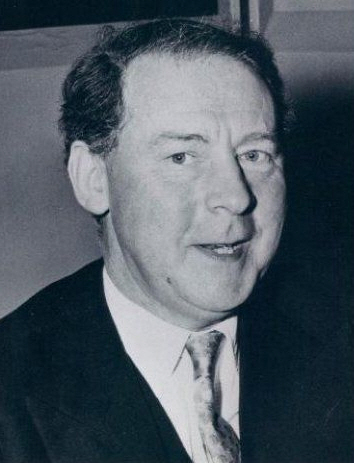
Hugh Gaitskell, Chancellor of the Exchequer, leader of the opposition

- Douglas Jardine, England cricketer
- David Eccles, 1st Viscount Eccles, Minister of State for the Arts
- Cecil Harmsworth King, newspaper publisher
- Claude Ashton, Essex cricketer and England footballer
- Anthony Asquith, film director
- E. E. Evans-Pritchard, anthropologist, author of Witchcraft, Oracles and Magic Among the Azande
- Francis Festing, Field Marshal
- Nowell Myres, archaeologist, Bodley's Librarian
- John Dring, Prime Minister of Bahawalpur
- George D'Oyly Snow, headmaster of Ardingly College and Bishop of Whitby
- Charles Bosanquet, academic
- Kenneth Clark, art historian and broadcaster
- Frank Ramsey, philosopher, mathematician and economist
- Patrick Balfour, 3rd Baron Kinross, writer on Islamic history
- John Snagge, Second World War BBC announcer
- Roger Makins, 1st Baron Sherfield, ambassador
- Colin Clark, economist and statistician
- Charles Francis Christopher Hawkes, archaeologist
- William Goodenough Hayter, diplomat, ambassador and Warden of New College, Oxford
- John Sparrow, literary critic and Warden of All Souls
- William Empson, literary critic
- Hugh Gaitskell, leader of the Labour Party
- Richard Wilberforce, Baron Wilberforce, Law Lord
- Richard Crossman, Labour politician and diarist
- Douglas Jay, Baron Jay, Labour politician
- Evelyn Shuckburgh, diplomat
- Douglas Dodds-Parker, soldier and politician

=== 1910–1919 ===
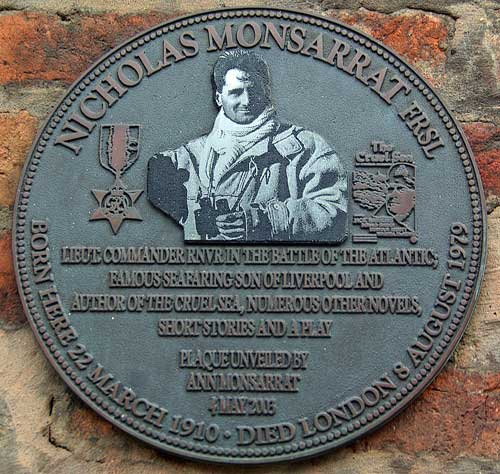
Nicholas Monsarrat, naval officer, author of The Cruel Sea

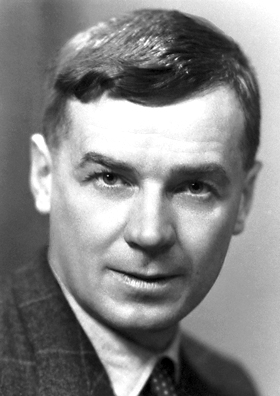
Richard Synge, inventor of partition chromatography

- Nicholas Monsarrat, naval officer, diplomat and author of The Cruel Sea
- John Stephenson, Lord Justice of Appeal
- John Fiennes, lawyer and parliamentary draftsman
- Roger Tredgold, fencer and psychiatrist
- Duncan Wilson, ambassador to the USSR and Master of Corpus Christi College, Cambridge
- John Pringle, zoologist
- Bruce Campbell, ornithologist, writer and broadcaster
- D. G. Champernowne, economist and mathematician
- Charles Madge, poet, Communist, sociologist
- Paul Reilly, designer
- Basil William Robinson, Asian art scholar and author
- Basil Martin Wright, inventor of the Peak flow meter
- Shaun Wylie, mathematician and Second World War Enigma and Tunny codebreaker
- Robert Irving, conductor
- Richard Synge, Nobel prize winning biochemist
- Lord Aldington, politician and businessman
- Stormont Mancroft, 2nd Baron Mancroft, government minister
- Michael Carver, Baron Carver, Field Marshal and philosopher
- Laurence Pumphrey, ambassador
- Robert Conquest, historian specialising in Joseph Stalin's purges
- Monty Woodhouse, Philhellene and politician
- Julian Faber, businessman
- James Joll, historian
- Willie Whitelaw, politician, deputy Prime Minister
- George Jellicoe, aka Viscount Brocas, soldier, statesman, businessman and diplomat
- M. R. D. Foot, historian
- Morys Bruce, 4th Baron Aberdare, politician

=== 1920–1929 ===
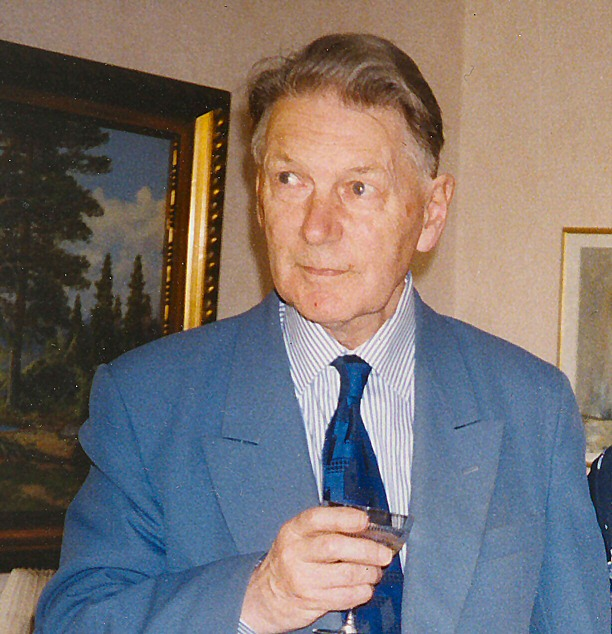
Paul Britten Austin, scholar of Swedish literature

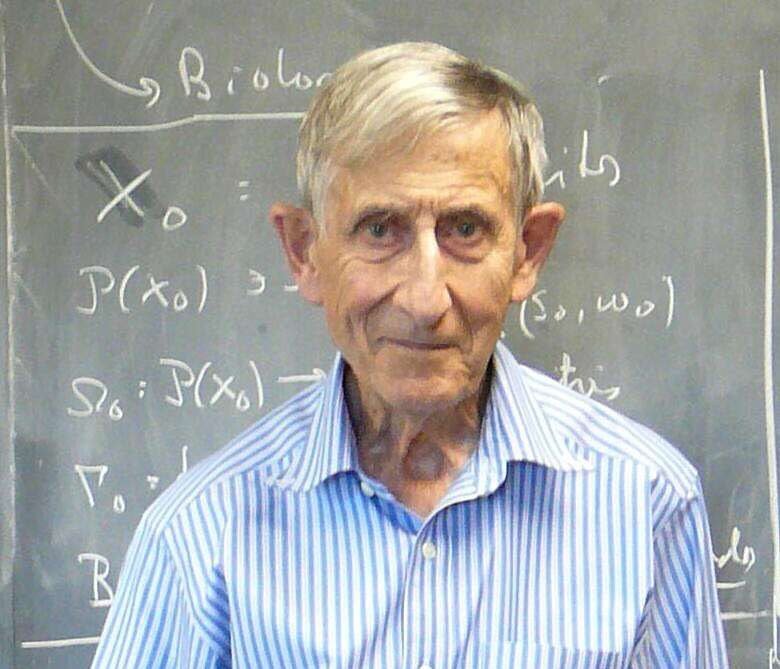
Freeman Dyson, physicist

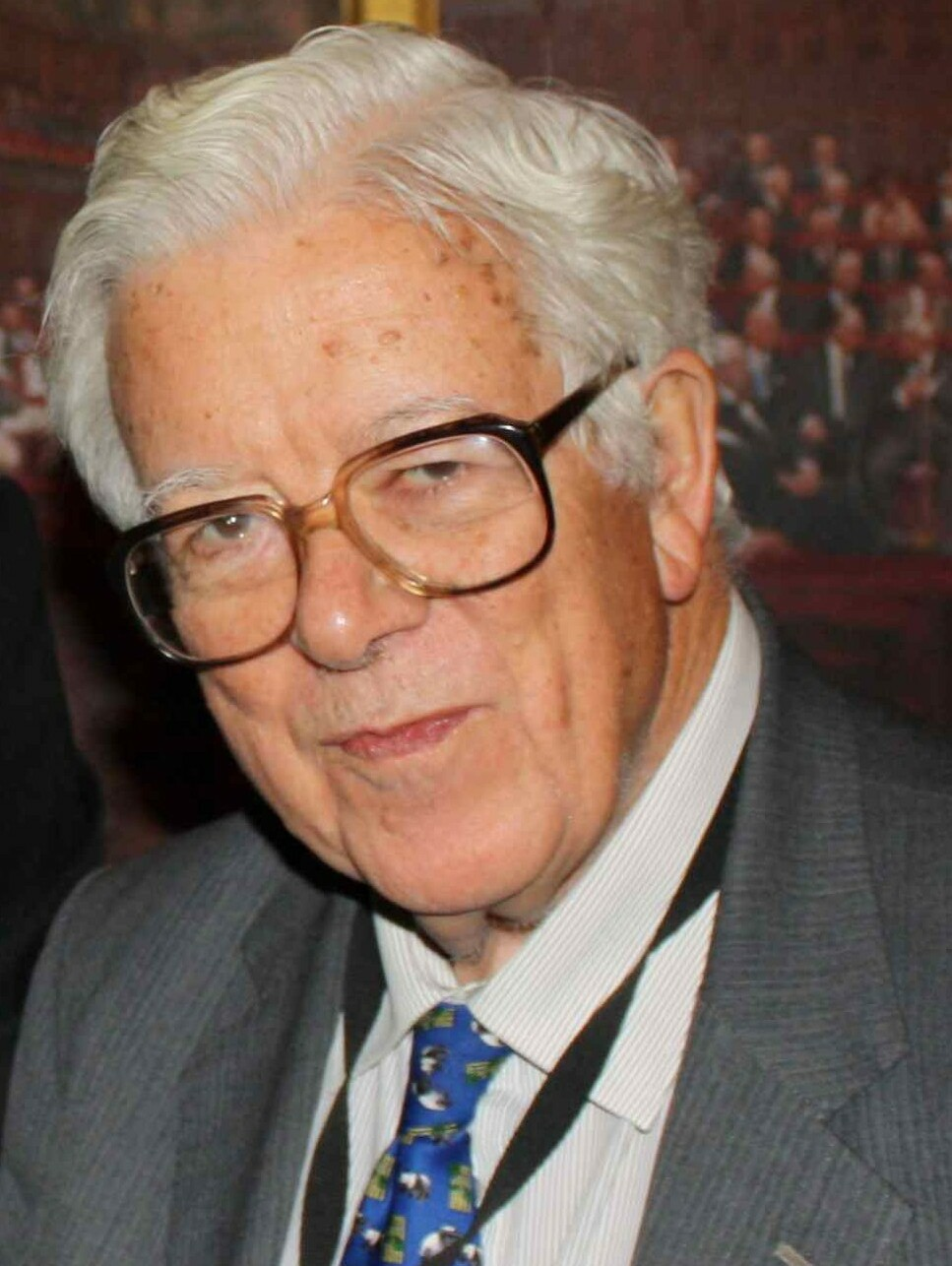
Geoffrey Howe, cabinet minister

- Henry Brandon, Law Lord
- Frank Thompson, SOE officer
- Anthony Storr, psychiatrist and author
- Michael Swann, molecular and cell biologist, BBC Chairman
- John Latham, artist
- Horace Barlow, neuroscientist
- Mark Bonham Carter, publisher and politician
- Tony Pawson, angler and cricketer
- Paul Britten Austin, translator of Swedish literature
- Peter Fowler, physicist working on elementary particles
- Hugh Beach, soldier, researcher into disarmament and ethics of war
- Freeman Dyson, physicist and mathematician
- H. Christopher Longuet-Higgins, theoretical chemist and cognitive scientist
- Bryan Thwaites, educator and mathematician
- Geoffrey Warnock, philosopher and academic
- Edgar Feuchtwanger, historian
- James Lighthill, applied mathematician working on fluid dynamics
- Michael Gow, general
- Brian Trubshaw, Concorde test pilot
- Michael S. Longuet-Higgins, mathematician and oceanographer
- Hubert Doggart, cricketer and schoolmaster
- Michael Dummett, philosopher
- John Balcombe, Lord Justice of Appeal
- Jack Boles, Director-General of the National Trust
- Geoffrey Howe, Lord Howe of Aberavon, politician
- Edgar Anstey, Civil Service psychologist to the Cuban Missile Crisis
- Ian Macdonald, mathematician
- Martin Beale, applied mathematician and statistician
- Jeremy Morse, banker and university chancellor
- Raymond Bonham Carter, banker
- Roger Wykeham Ellis, headmaster of Rossall and Marlborough
- John Lucas, philosopher
- Robert Shirley, 13th Earl Ferrers, politician

=== 1930–1939 ===
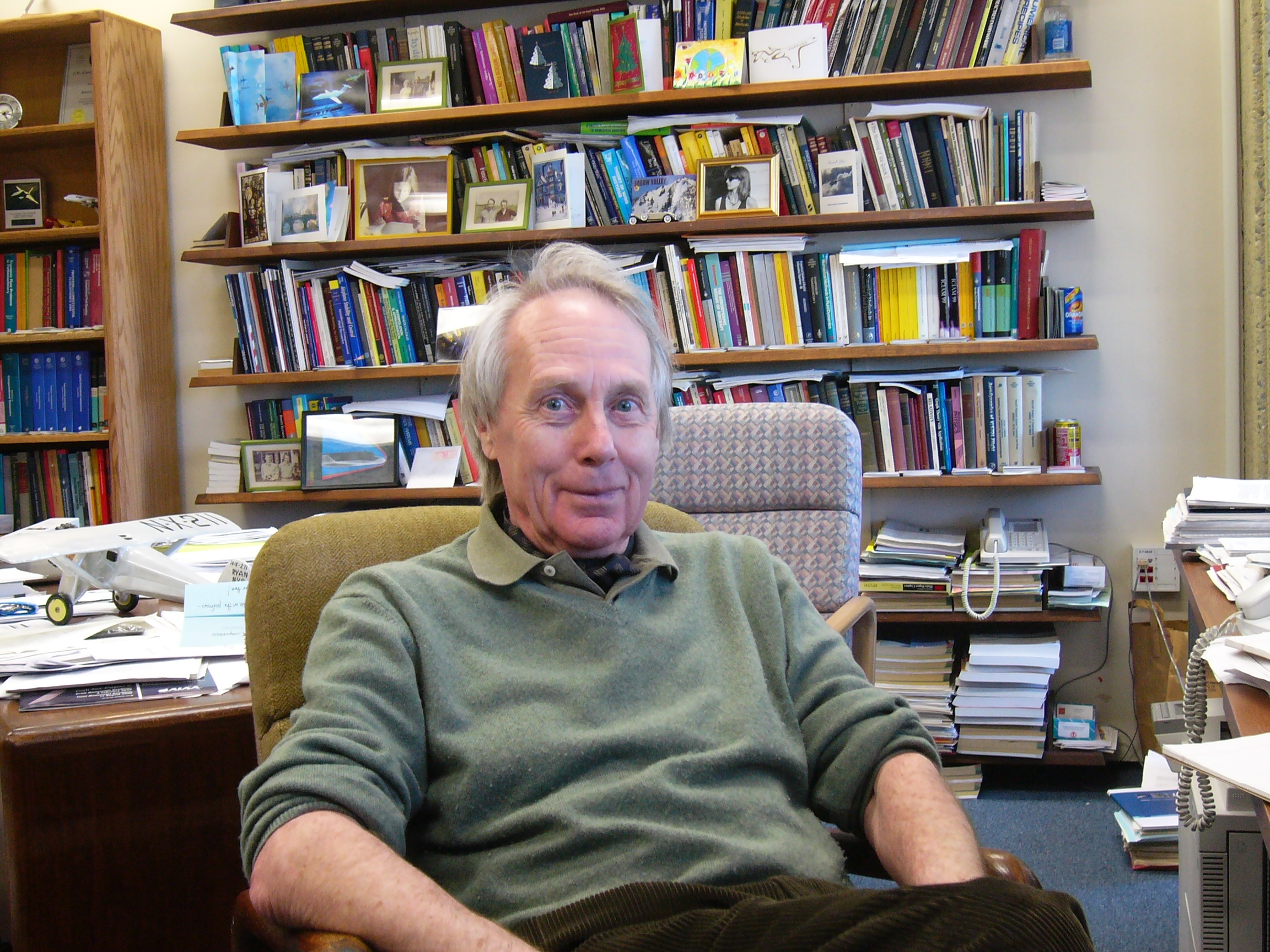
Antony Jameson, aeronautical engineer

- Alasdair Milne, BBC Director General
- George Younger, 4th Viscount Younger of Leckie, Secretary of State for Defence
- Reginald Bosanquet, ITN newscaster
- Guy Antony Jameson, aeronautical engineer
- David Thouless, Nobel prizewinning physicist
- Stuart Anstis, psychologist
- Nicholas Mackintosh, experimental psychologist
- William Donaldson, writer and satirist; creator of Henry Root
- Murray Lawrence, chairman of Lloyd's
- Julian Mitchell, playwright
- David Hannay, Baron Hannay of Chiswick, ambassador to the United Nations

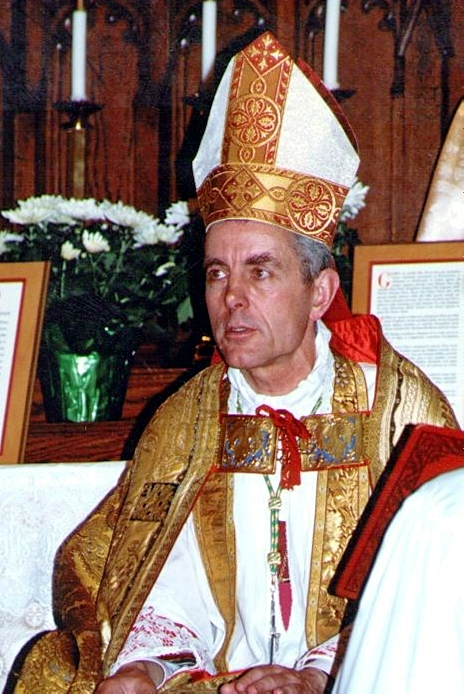
Richard Williamson, controversial Catholic bishop

- Giles Radice, Labour politician
- Jonathan D. Spence, historian and sinologist
- John Albery, scientist
- Ian Gow, politician
- Jonathan Parker, Lord Justice of Appeal
- Paul Bergne, intelligence officer, linguist and diplomat
- Peter Jay, economist, journalist and ambassador
- David Miers, ambassador
- Richard Storey, businessman
- Christopher Miles, film director

=== 1940–1949 ===
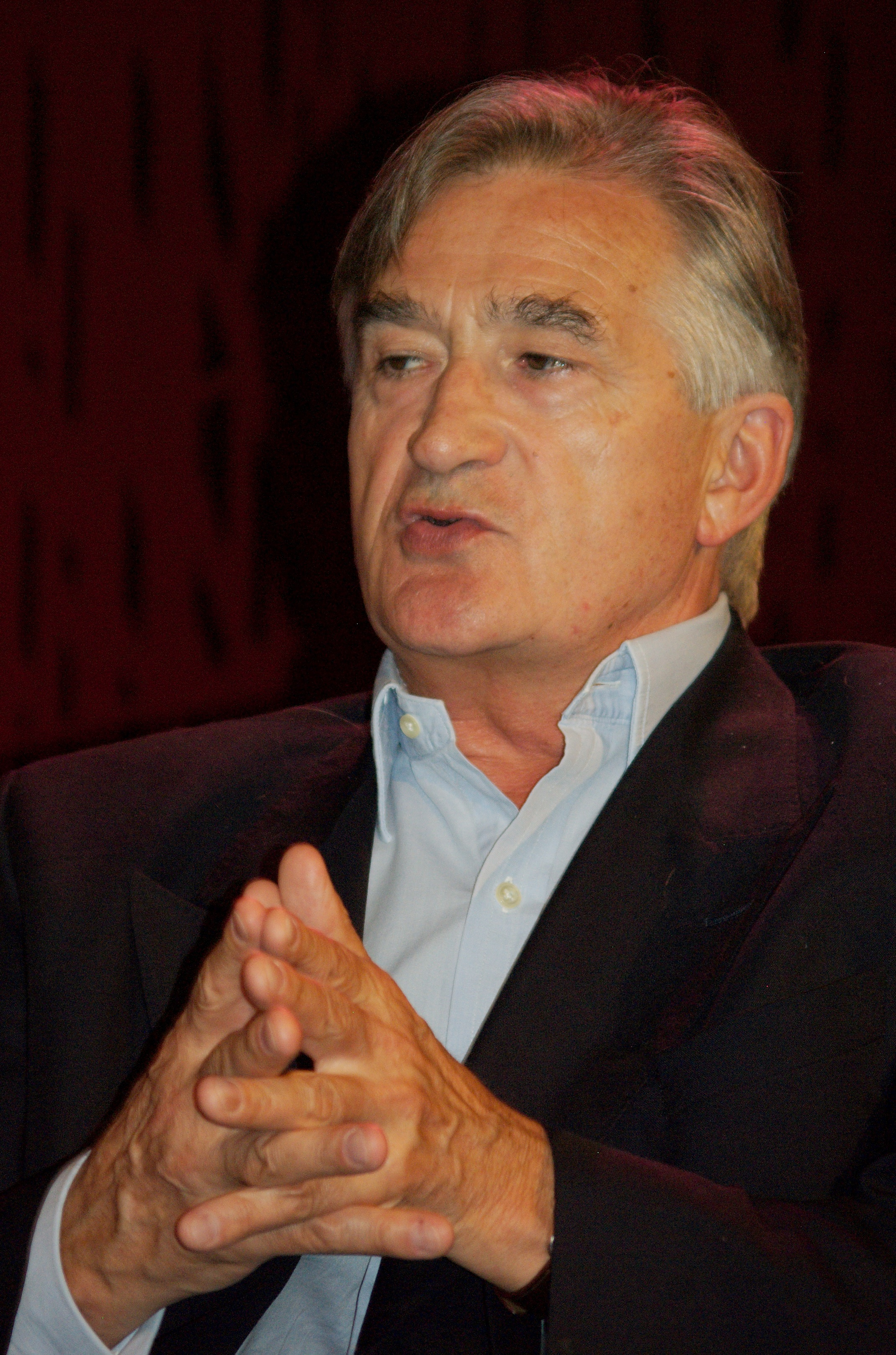
Antony Beevor, military historian

- David Brewer, broker, Lord Mayor of London
- Richard Williamson, traditionalist Catholic bishop
- Mansoor Ali Khan Pataudi, captain of India's cricket team
- Charles Gray, lawyer and judge
- Tim Brooke-Taylor, comedian
- Andrew Large, banker and businessman
- Patrick Moberly, ambassador
- David Soskice, political economist
- Patrick Minford, economist
- Hew Pike, soldier
- Donald A. Gillies, philosopher and historian of science and technology
- Andrew Longmore, Lord Justice of Appeal
- Madhavrao Scindia, Indian cabinet minister
- Martin Nourse, Lord Justice of Appeal
- Lord Jay of Ewelme, head of the Foreign Office
- Antony Beevor, military historian
- Richard Noble, designer of the ThrustSSC
- Timothy Lloyd, Lord Justice of Appeal

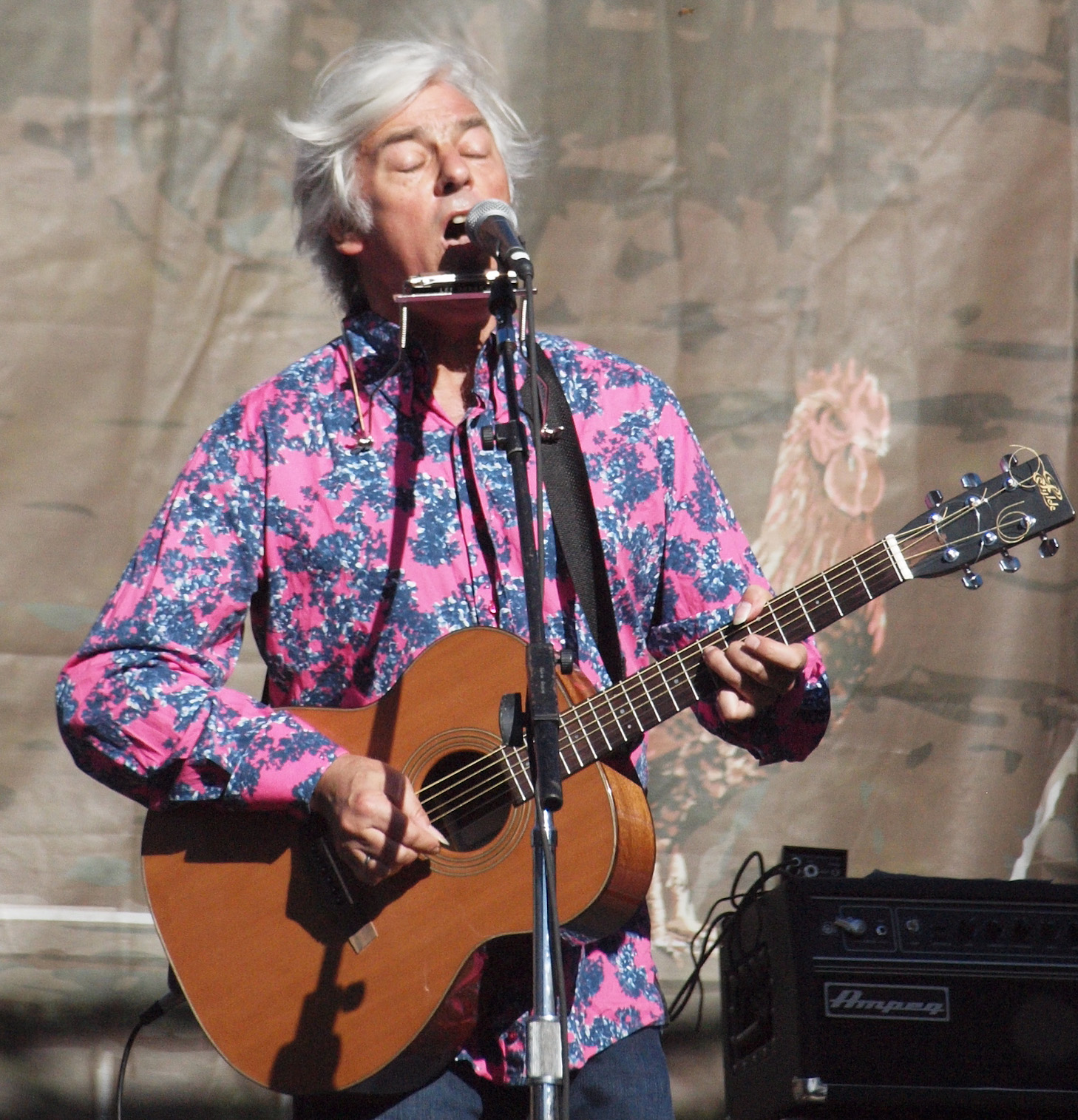
Robyn Hitchcock, singer-songwriter

- Roy Dyckhoff, computer scientist and mathematician
- Charles Sinclair, businessman, Warden of Winchester College 2014–2019
- David Clementi, financier, Warden of Winchester College 2008–2014

=== 1950–1959 ===
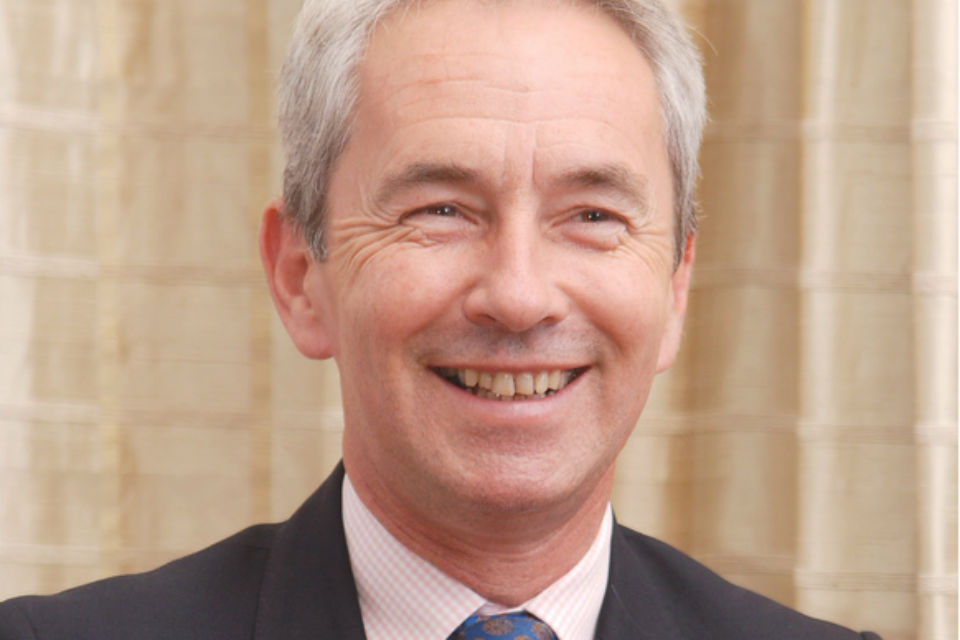
Richard Stagg, ambassador

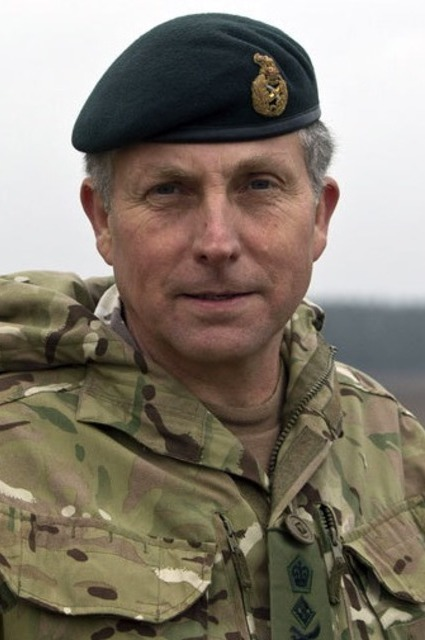
Nick Carter, Chief of the Defence Staff

- Christopher Suenson-Taylor, 3rd Baron Grantchester, Labour peer
- Tim Eggar, Conservative politician
- Anthony Pawson, biochemist
- Galen Strawson, philosopher
- Nicholas Underhill, Lord Justice of Appeal
- Mark Ellen, music journalist and broadcaster
- Robyn Hitchcock, singer-songwriter
- Alan Lovell, businessman
- Nicholas Shepherd-Barron, mathematician
- James Mallet, evolutionary zoologist
- James Younger, 5th Viscount Younger of Leckie, peer and politician
- Richard Stagg, ambassador, Warden of Winchester College 2019–
- Nicholas Shakespeare, novelist
- Michael Hofmann, poet and translator
- J.G. Sandom, author
- Francis Pott, composer and pianist
- John Whittingdale, Culture Secretary
- John Campbell, economist
- Seumas Milne, journalist
- Jon Leyne, BBC foreign correspondent
- James Bucknall, soldier
- Peter Neyroud, police chief
- Nick Carter, Chief of the Defence Staff; Ad Portas, 2021

=== 1960–1969 ===
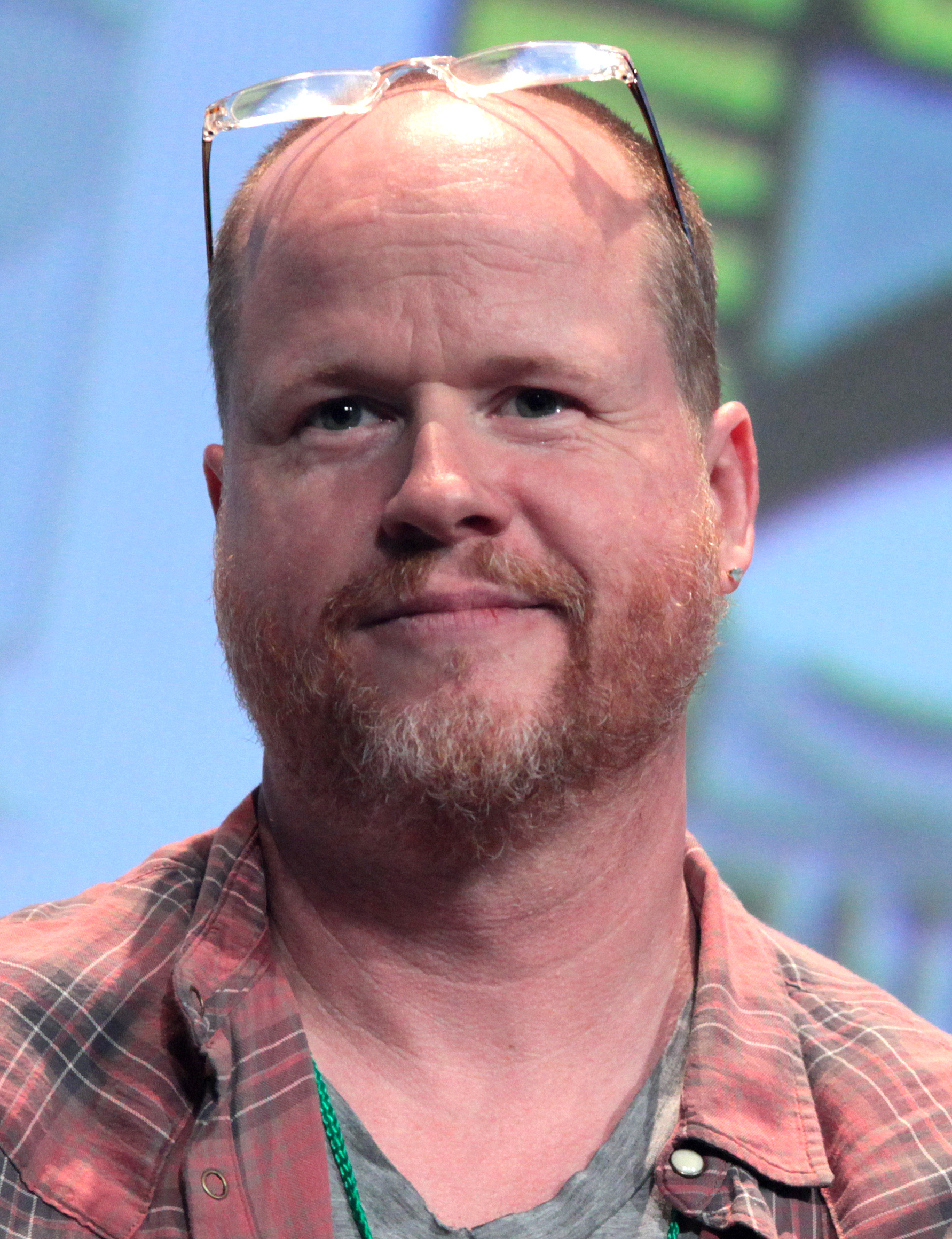
Joss Whedon, film director

- Nicholas Watson, medievalist
- Stephen Cobb, Lord Justice of Appeal
- Korn Chatikavanij, finance minister of Thailand
- Joss Whedon, film director
- Alex Ellis, ambassador
- Charles Edwards, actor
- Nigel Cliff, biographer

=== 1970–1979 ===
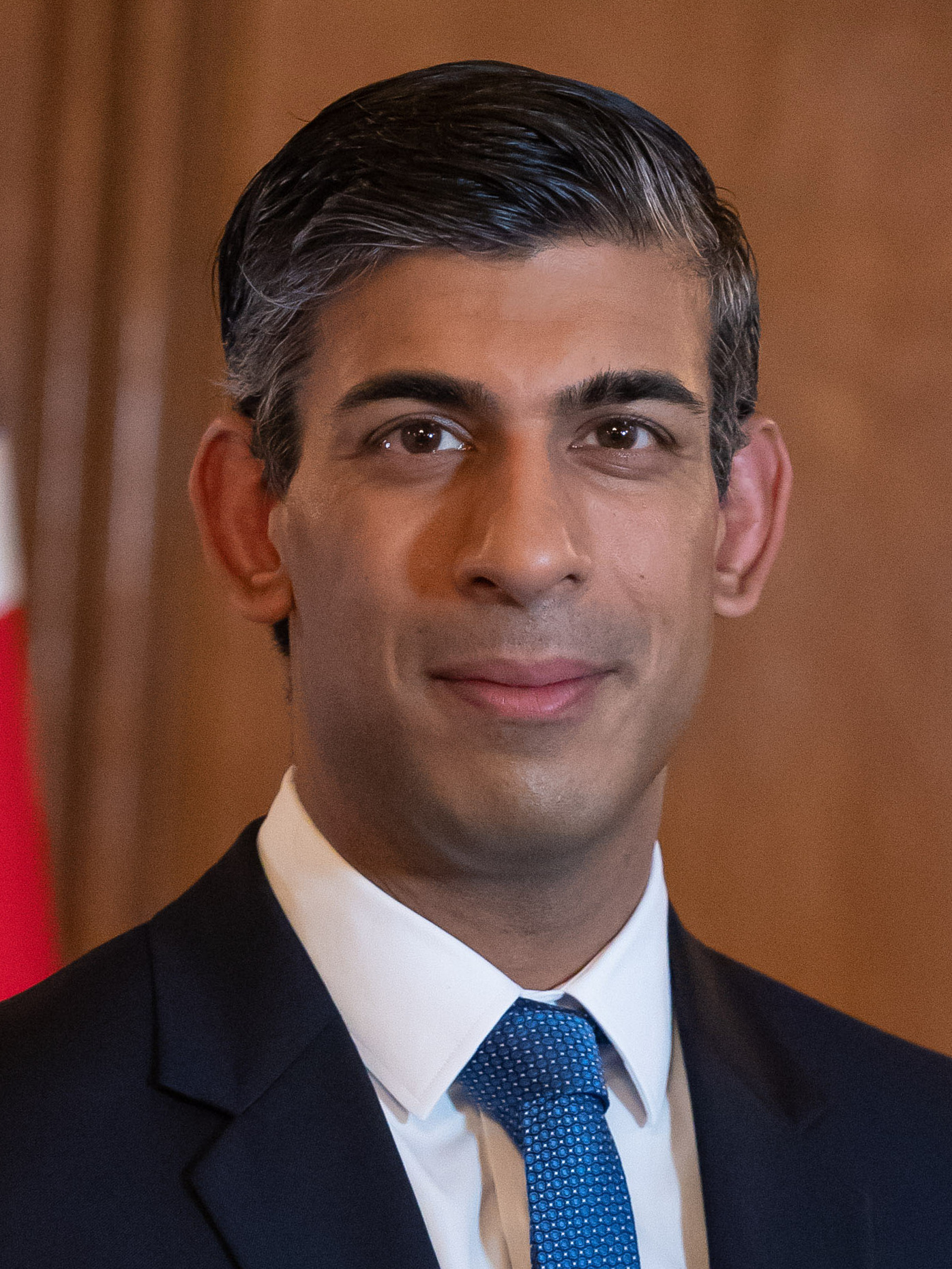
Rishi Sunak, Prime Minister

- Saif Ali Khan, actor
- Simon Henderson, headmaster of Eton College
- Alex Chalk, Justice Secretary, Lord Chancellor
- Alistair Potts, world champion cox
- Sam Woods, deputy governor of Bank of England, Chair of Prudential Regulation Authority

=== 1980–1989 ===
- Rishi Sunak, Prime Minister
- James Forsyth, political aide and journalist
- Anthony Smith, sculptor
- Ned Beauman, author
- Will Sharpe, actor
- George Nash, Olympic rower

== Victoria Cross and George Cross holders ==
Gustavus Coulson, one of the Old Wykehamists who won the Victoria Cross

Six Old Wykehamists have won the Victoria Cross (VC), four in the First World War, 1914–18 (of whom three were killed in action) and two prior to 1914. Also in the Second World War one Old Wykehamist won the George Cross and one the George Medal, both in military circumstances.

- Victoria Cross
  - Indian Mutiny
    - Lieutenant Alfred Spencer Heathcote (1832–1912) for his conduct during the Siege of Delhi
  - Boer War
    - Lieutenant Gustavus Hamilton Blenkinsopp Coulson (1879–1901)
  - First World War
    - Captain Arthur Forbes Gordon Kilby (1885–1915); he also won the Military Cross.
    - Second Lieutenant Dennis George Wyldbore Hewitt (1897–1917)
    - Lieutenant Colonel Charles Hotham Montagu Doughty-Wylie (1868–1915)
    - Lieutenant Colonel Daniel Burges (1873–1946); he also won the Distinguished Service Order and the Croix de guerre avec Palme.
- George Cross
  - Second World War
    - Sub-Lieutenant Peter Victor Danckwerts (1916–1984) for gallantry defusing mines dropped on London
- George Medal
  - Second World War
    - Lieutenant Geoffrey Ambrose Hodges, RNVR (military, but for gallantry not in the face of the enemy)

== See also ==
- Winchester College in fiction, with a list of the many fictional Old Wykehamists in literature

== Cited sources ==
- Badcock, C. F.; La Corrie, J. R. Winchester College: A Register for the Years 1930 To 1975. Winchester College, 1992.
- Dilke, Christopher. Dr Moberly's Mint-Mark: A Study of Winchester College . London, 1965.
- Firth, J. D'E. Winchester College. Winchester, 1961.
- Hardy, H. J. Winchester College, 1867–1920 P. and G. Wells, 1923.
- Lamb, L. H. Winchester College A Register 1915–1960. P. & G. Wells, 1974.
- Leach, Arthur F. A History of Winchester College. London and New York, 1899.
- Maclure, P. S. W. K.; Stevens, R. P. Winchester College, A Register. Winchester College, 2014.
- Sabben-Clare, James. Winchester College. Paul Cave Publications, 1981.
- Wainewright, John Bannerman (ed). Winchester College 1836–1906: A Register. P. and G. Wells, 1907.
- Wilson, E. A.; Jackson, H. A. Winchester College: A Register for the Years 1901 to 1946, Edward Arnold, 1956.
