= Hiddleston =

Hiddleston is a surname. Notable people with the surname include:

- Hugh Hiddleston (1855–1934), Australian cricketer
- Patricia Hiddleston (1933–2017), Scottish mathematician
- Stuart Hiddleston (1910–1984), South African cricketer and physician
- Syd Hiddleston (1890–1940), New Zealand cricketer
- Tom Hiddleston (born 1981), English actor

== See also ==
- Hudleston
- Huddleston
