= Flyfishers' Club =

Organisation in London, England

Coordinates: 51.5124°N 0.1491°W

The Flyfishers' Club
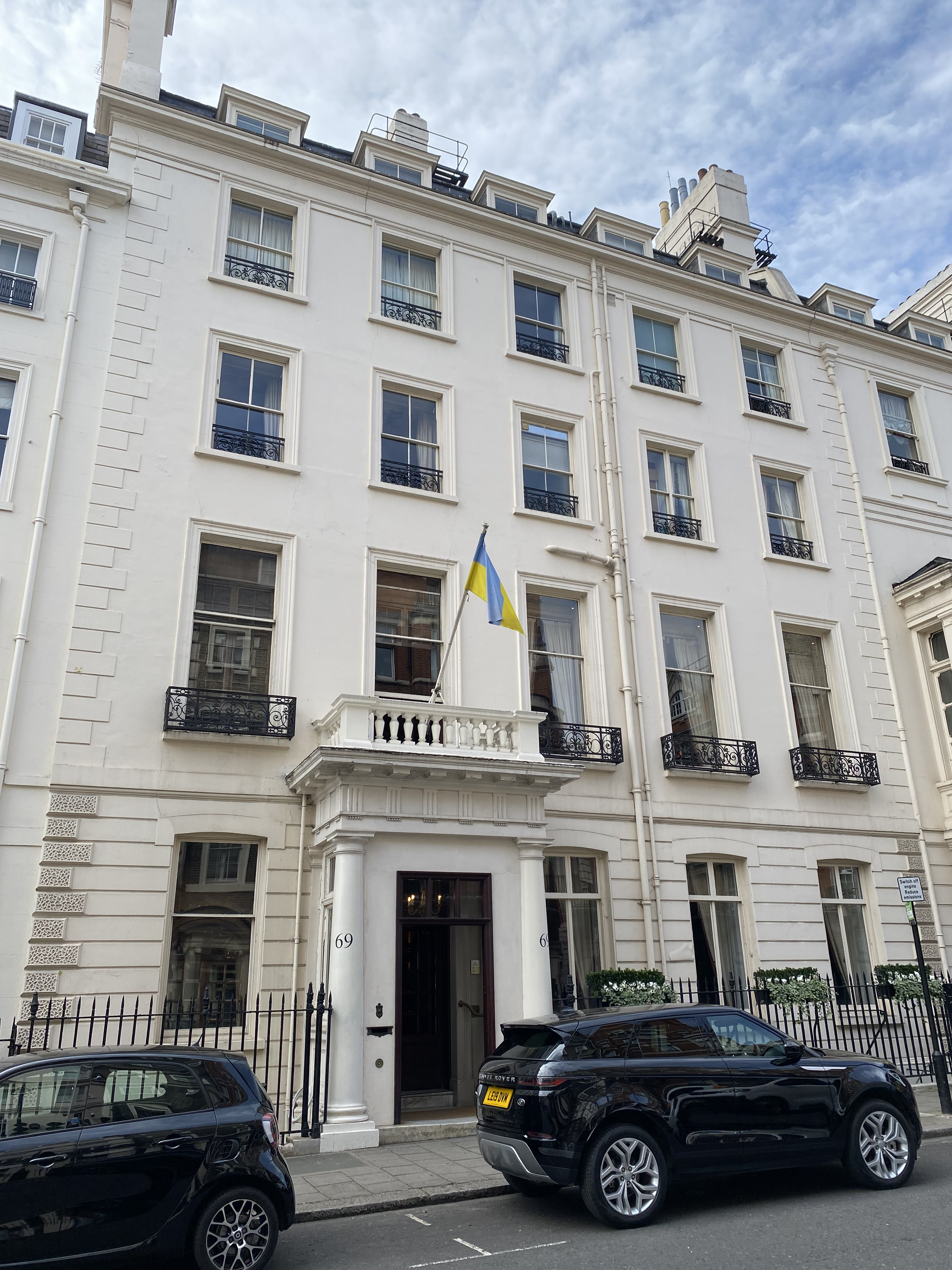
- Founded: 1884; 142 years ago
- Type: Gentlemen's club
- Location(s): 69 Brook Street, London, England (in space leased from Savile Club)
- Patron: King Charles III
- President: Alastair Collett
- Website: flyfishersclub.org.uk

The Flyfishers' Club is a gentlemen's club in London, England, which was founded in 1884 for enthusiasts of flyfishing. In 1894, the club had more than three hundred members, while in 1984, this number had risen to between eight and nine hundred members.

== History ==
The club's library has been described as one of the finest of its kind in Europe; it has a collection of around three thousand works on the subject of fishing, including works such as the successful Floating Flies and How to Dress Them and Dry Fly Fishing in Theory and Practice by F.M. Halford, one of the club's co-founders. Many well-known writers on angling are members, and have contributed signed copies of their publications to the library.

According to Basil Field, the founding president, the original prospectus described the club's purposes as follows:

"To bring together gentlemen devoted to fly-fishing generally.
"To afford a ready means of communication between those interested in this delightful art.
"To provide in the reading-room, in addition to all the usual newspapers, periodicals, &c., catalogues, and books, foreign as well as English, having reference to fishing, particularly to fly-fishing so as to render the club a means of obtaining knowledge about new fishing places and vacancies for rods, and making it a general medium of information on all points relating to the art."

The club publishes a long-standing magazine, the Flyfishers' Journal; writers included G. E. M. Skues, who has been described as "one of the greatest trout fishermen that ever lived." Skues dedicated his 1921 book, The Way of a Trout with the Fly to The Flyfishers' Club "in gratitude for many happy hours and some priceless friends". In 1938, a debate was held at the club on Skues's controversial theories about the use of nymphs in fly-fishing, which led him to publish Nymph Fishing for Chalk Stream Trout.

The club also has a museum of fishing memorabilia which holds a rod used by David Garrick and a case of flies reputed to have belonged to Izaak Walton. Other items include a rod box originally exhibited in The Great Exhibition at The Crystal Palace in 1851 and a pirn (used as an alternative to a fishing reel) which belonged to the "Ettrick Sheppherd" James Hogg.

In the autumn of 2024, a vote of the membership was taken to open up membership in the club to women; this passed with a 75% majority.

== Premises ==
The Flyfishers’ has had a number of homes. It had no permanent home of its own for the first four years of its existence, but opened its first rooms of its own in the Arundel Hotel in 1888, then moved to No. 8 Haymarket in 1889 and remained there until 1907, when it moved to Swallow Street, Piccadilly. It stayed there until destroyed in The Blitz in 1941. Since then it has leased premises in several other London clubs. Today, the Club leases rooms in the Savile Club, 69 Brook Street in central London.

== Notable members ==
- Basil Field
- R. B. Marston
- Frederic M. Halford
- Henry Batten Huddleston
- Edward Grey, 1st Viscount Grey of Fallodon
- G. E. M. Skues
- Francis Francis
- Arthur Ransome
- Eric Taverner
- Hugh Falkus
- Donald Overfield
- Charles Sinclair, chairman of Associated British Foods.
- Richard Walker
- William Daniel

Its current patron is King Charles III.

== Past Presidents ==
- Basil Field 1896
- R. B. Marston 1897
- Wm. Senior 1898
- C. H. Cook 1899
- W. Pingo Horton 1900
- H. E. Gribble 1901
- Hedley F. Norris 1902
- Frederic M. Halford 1903
- Rev. G. E. Mackie 1904
- C. A. Payton 1903 - 1905
- Judge Gwynne James 1906 - 1907
- G. M. Bond 1908
- C. K. Burtt 1909
- R. B. Marston 1910 - 1911

== See also ==
- List of London's gentlemen's clubs
