= William Huddleston =

William Huddleston may refer to:

- William Huddleston (colonial administrator) (1826–1894), acting governor of Madras, 1881
- Bill Huddleston (1873–1962), English cricketer
- Yusef Lateef born William Emanuel Huddleston (1920–2013), American jazz multi-instrumentalist and composer
- William Huddleston (MP) (died 1628), English Member of Parliament
- William Huddleston (reverend), father of Amelia Edith Huddleston Barr
