= Hudleston =

Hudleston is a surname. Notable people with the surname include:

- Cuthbert Hudleston (1863–1940), Australian Anglican priest
- Edmund Hudleston (1908–1994), Royal Air Force officer
- Josiah Andrew Hudleston (1799–1865), Anglo-Irish guitarist and composer
- Wilfred Hudleston Hudleston (1828–1909), English geologist

The surname Hudleston may also be used as a forename, for example:

- Guy Hudleston Boisragon (1864–1931), English Army officer

== See also ==
- Huddleston
- Hiddleston
