= John Huddleston (disambiguation) =

John Huddleston (1608–1698) was an English Benedictine monk and priest.

John Huddleston is the name of:

- John Huddleston (MP for Cumberland) (died 1493)
- John Huddleston (MP for Cambridgeshire) (1517–1557)
- John Huddleston (cricketer) (1837–1904), Australian cricketer
- John Huddleston (American football) (born 1954), American football player
- John Dormer (Jesuit) (real name John Huddleston), (1636–1700), English Jesuit cleric
- John Walter Huddleston (1815–1890), English lawyer and judge
