= Huddleston, Arkansas =

- Unincorporated community
- Location within Arkansas Location within the United States
- Coordinates: 34°35′10″N 93°50′44″W
- Country: United States
- State: Arkansas
- County: Montgomery
- Elevation: 853 ft (260 m)
- Time zone: UTC-6 (Central (CST))
  - Summer (DST): UTC-5 (CDT)
- Area code: 479
- GNIS feature ID: 74580

Huddleston is an unincorporated community in Montgomery County, Arkansas, United States.
