= John Huddleston (cricketer) =

Australian cricketer

Personal information
- Born: 25 November 1837; Nottingham, England
- Died: 1904 (aged 66–67); Brunswick, Victoria, Australia

Domestic team information
- Years: Team
- 1860-1863: Victoria
- Source: Cricinfo, 3 May 2015

John Huddleston (25 November 1837 – 1904) was an Australian cricketer. He played five first-class cricket matches for Victoria between 1860 and 1863.

== See also ==
- List of Victoria first-class cricketers
