= Gustavus Coulson =

Recipient of the Victoria Cross

Gustavus Hamilton Blenkinsopp Coulson VC DSO
- Lieutenant Gustavus Coulson c. 1900–1901
- Born: 1 April 1879; Wimbledon, England
- Died: 18 May 1901 (aged 22); Lambrechtfontein, Orange Free State
- Burial place: Lambrechtfontein
- Military career
- Allegiance: United Kingdom
- Branch: British Army
- Service years: 1899–1901
- Rank: Lieutenant
- Units: Green Howards; The King's Own Scottish Borderers
- Conflicts: Second Boer War
- Awards: Victoria Cross; Distinguished Service Order; Mentioned in Despatches

Gustavus Hamilton Blenkinsopp Coulson, VC, DSO (1 April 1879 – 18 May 1901) was a British Army officer and an English recipient of the Victoria Cross, the highest decoration for gallantry "in the face of the enemy" awarded to members of the British and Commonwealth armed forces.

== Early life ==
Coulson was born on 1 April 1879 in Wimbledon, London, and educated at Winchester College.

== Military career ==
Coulson was 22 years old, and a lieutenant and Adjutant in the 1st Battalion, The King's Own Scottish Borderers, British Army during the Second Boer War when the following deed took place on 18 May 1901 at Lambrechtfontein, South Africa, for which he was posthumously awarded the VC:

This Officer during a rear-guard action, near Lambrecht Fontein, on the 18th of May, 1901, seeing Corporal Cranmer, 7th Mounted Infantry, dismounted, his horse having been shot, remained behind and took him up on his own horse. He rode a short distance, when the horse was shot, and both Lieutenant Coulson and the Corporal were brought to the ground. Lieutenant Coulson told Corporal Cranmer to get along with the wounded horse as best he could, and he would look after himself. Corporal Cranmer got on the horse and rode away to the column. No. 4792 Corporal Shaw (Lincolns), 7th Mounted Infantry, seeing Lieutenant Coulson's position of danger, rode back through the rear-guard, and took him up on his horse. A few minutes later Corporal Shaw was shot through the body, and there is reason to believe that Lieutenant Coulson was wounded also, as he fell off his horse. Corporal Shaw fell off a few minutes later. This Officer on many occasions throughout the Campaign displayed great coolness and gallantry under fire.

There is a memorial to Coulson in St Peter's Church, Tiverton, Devon, and his Victoria Cross is displayed at the Regimental Museum of The Kings Own Scottish Borderers, Berwick upon Tweed, Northumberland.
