= Henry Batten Huddleston =

Henry Batten Huddleston OBE VD
- Born: 22 January 1864; Barrackpore, India
- Died: 7 March 1944 (aged 80); Hove, England

Lieutenant Colonel Henry Batten Huddleston OBE VD (22 January 1864 – 7 March 1944), also known as H.B. Huddleston, was Chief Agent and later a Director of the Burma Railways. During World War I, Huddleston commanded the Burma Railway Battalion of the Indian Defence Force. He was Honorary Aide-de-Camp to the Lieutenant Governor of Burma and Chairman of the Rangoon Port Trust.

== Life ==
Henry Batten Huddleston was born in Barrackpore, India, on 22 January 1864, the son of Graham Egerton Huddleston by his second wife, Amelia Frances Sophia (née Batten). He was educated at Bedford Modern School.

Huddleston was Chief Agent and later a Director of the Burma Railways. During World War I, Huddleston commanded the Burma Railway Battalion of the Indian Defence Force. He was Honorary Aide-de-Camp to the Lieutenant Governor of Burma and Chairman of the Rangoon Port Trust.

On 27 October 1887, Huddleston married Mary Louise Fraser at Purneah, Bengal. They had one son, Leslie, who died as an infant, and a daughter, Winifred Evelyn Huddleston. After his retirement, Huddleston was offered a seat on the London board of the Burma Railways.

Huddleston's greatest hobby was fishing and he was a member of the Flyfishers' Club. He died on 7 March 1944.
