= Ernest Huddleston =

Captain Sir Ernest Whiteside Huddleston CIE CBE
- Born: 18 August 1874; Murree, Punjab
- Died: 10 October 1959 (aged 85); Devon, England
- Military career
- Allegiance: United Kingdom
- Branch: Royal Indian Marine
- Rank: Commander
- Awards: CIE; CBE; Stanhope Silver Medal

Captain Sir Ernest Whiteside Huddleston CIE CBE (18 August 1874 – 10 October 1959) was a British military commander who was Deputy Director and officiating Commander of the Royal Indian Marine. He was later Shipping Surveyor and Adviser to the High Commissioner for India and ADC to the Viceroy.

== Early life ==
Ernest Whiteside Huddleston was born in 1874 at Murree in the Punjab. Like his brother Willoughby Baynes Huddleston, at the age of 7 he was sent to Bedford Modern School which he attended between 1881 and 1888, leaving the school at fourteen to join the Merchant Navy.

== Career ==
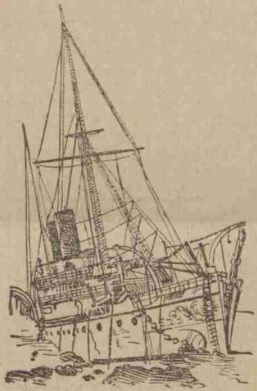
A sketch depicting the wreck of the RIMS Warren Hastings, published by the Dundee Courier on 24 March 1897.

Having joined the Merchant Navy in 1888, Huddleston received his certificate as Second mate of a Foreign Going Ship on 30 May 1895. He then joined the Royal Indian Marine initially serving in the Egyptian Campaign. He took the Officer's course at the Royal Naval College, Greenwich and in 1897 was in the troopship, Warren Hastings, when she was wrecked at sea off the coast of Mauritius. For his role in the rescue of those on board, Huddleston was awarded the Royal Humane Society's silver medal for gallantry.

Huddleston served in the China Expedition against the Boxer Rising (1901–02). During World War I he served as senior marine transport officer of Bombay. He was promoted to captain in 1918 and was presidency port officer of Madras before being appointed deputy director of the Royal Indian Marine in 1924 and officiating director for some months in 1925.

Huddleston then served in the Indian Civil Service as shipping surveyor and adviser to the High Commissioner for India in London. He was at one point aide-de-camp to the Viceroy, Lord Reading.

Huddleston was placed on the retired list of the Royal Navy in 1934 and was knighted in 1939.

== Family life ==
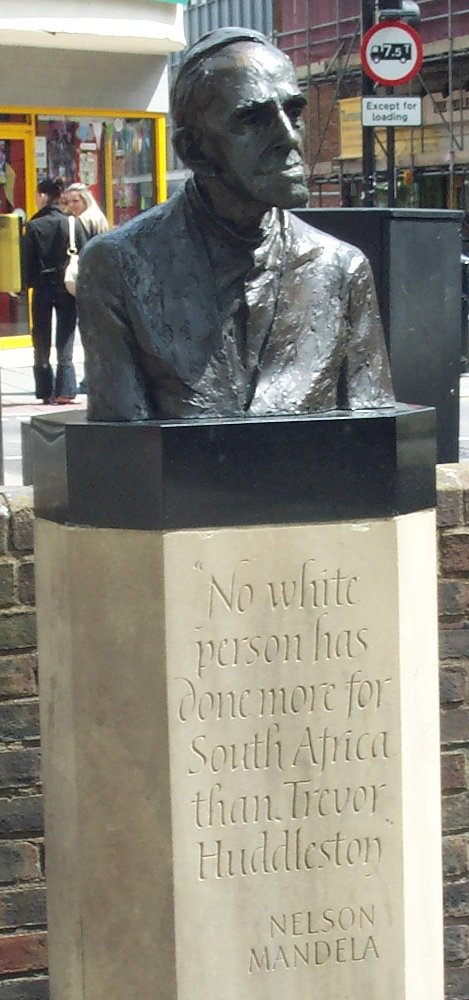
Trevor Huddleston Bust in Bedford, England

On 4 August 1904, Huddleston married Elsie Barlow-Smith; they'd met in Bedford as school children. The first child of the marriage was a daughter, Barbara. Trevor, later Bishop of Johannesburg, was born in Bedford on 13 June 1913. His first wife died in 1931 and in 1932 he married Lorna, daughter of W.W. Box of Hampstead.

Huddleston died on 10 October 1959 in Devon.
