= Richard Huddleston =

Richard Huddleston may refer to:

- Richard Huddleston (monk) (1583–1655)
- Richard Huddleston (MP) (1535–1589)
