= Willoughby Baynes Huddleston =

Commander Willoughby Baynes Huddleston CMG
- Commander W.B. Huddleston CMG
- Born: 1866
- Died: 1 May 1953 (aged 86–87)
- Military career
- Allegiance: United Kingdom
- Branch: Royal Indian Marine
- Rank: Commander
- Awards: CMG; Stanhope Gold Medal

Commander Willoughby Baynes Huddleston CMG (1866 – 1 May 1953) was a Commander in the Royal Indian Marine and Aide-de-Camp to Lord Pentland, Governor of Madras (1912–19). He held the position of Presidency Port Officer, Madras.

== Career ==
Huddleston was born in 1866, the third son of Major Graham Egerton Huddleston and Amelia Frances Sophia (née Batten). He was educated at Bedford Modern School and HMS Conway.

Huddleston entered the Royal Indian Marine in 1887 and was involved in the Marine Survey of India (1888–93). In 1891 he was awarded the Stanhope Gold Medal by the Royal Humane Society for rescuing a seaman from shark infested waters off the Bay of Bengal. In 1894 he was one of the Colonial and Indian notabilities presented at the Queen's Levée at St James's Palace.

In 1904, Huddleston became a Commander in the Royal Indian Marine. He commanded RIMS Dufferin on the occasion of the Coronation of King George V (Coronation Medal).

Huddleston was Aide-de-Camp to Lord Pentland who was Governor of Madras (1912–19). During World War I he served as Principal Marine Transport Officer, Mesopotamia (1915) to the fall of Kut-al-amara where he was mentioned in despatches three times and made a Companion of the Order of St Michael and St George.

== Family life ==
Huddleston was the brother of Sir Ernest Whiteside Huddleston and the uncle of Archbishop Trevor Huddleston. He married Mary Lawrence, daughter of Sir John Strachey GCSI, CIE. He died on 1 May 1953 and was survived by one daughter.
