= Ferdinand Huddleston =

English cricketer

Personal information
- Full name: Ferdinand Huddleston

Domestic team information
- Years: Team
- 1842–1843: Hampshire
- 1841: Marylebone Cricket Club

Career statistics
Competition	FC
Matches	4
Runs scored	59
Batting average	14.75
100s/50s	–/–
Top score	21*
Balls bowled	–
Wickets	–
Bowling average	–
5 wickets in innings	–
10 wickets in match	–
Best bowling	–
Catches/stumpings	–/–
- Source: Cricinfo, 15 February 2010

Ferdinand Huddleston (1812 in England – 1 July 1890 at Bembridge, Isle of Wight) was an English first-class cricketer.

Huddleston made his first-class debut for the Marylebone Cricket Club against Oxford University in 1841.

Huddleston also represented Hampshire, making his debut for the county in 1842 against the Marylebone Cricket Club. Huddleston played two further first-class matches for Hampshire, both coming in 1843 against the Marylebone Cricket Club.

In his first-class career, Huddleston scored 59 runs at a batting average of 14.75 and a high score of 21*.

Huddleston died at Bembridge on the Isle of Wight on 1 July 1890.
