= Hugh Hiddleston =

Australian cricketer

Personal information
- Born: 1855; Australia
- Died: 14 May 1934 (aged 78–79); Coolgardie, Western Australia, Australia
- Source: ESPNcricinfo, 31 December 2016

Hugh Hiddleston (1855 – 14 May 1934) was an Australian cricketer. He played fifteen first-class matches for New South Wales between 1880/81 and 1888/89.

== See also ==
- List of New South Wales representative cricketers
