= Charles Malan =

Former Indian civil servant and Postmaster General

Charles Huntingford Malan OBE (1884-13 January 1930) was an Indian Civil Servant and Postmaster General of the Madras Presidency.

Malan was born in 1884 in Surrey, England and was educated at Winchester College and Lincoln College, Oxford. He passed the Indian Civil Service examination in 1907 and moved to the Punjab as a Political Assistant. From 1913 to 1915 he commanded a section of the Border Military Police.

In 1919 he became a postal censor in Lahore for which he was appointed an Officer of the Order of the British Empire (OBE). In the early 1920s he became the Postmaster-General of the United Provinces.

Malan died in Madras on 13 January 1930 aged 46.
