= Charles Sinclair (businessman) =

British businessman (born 1948)

- Born: 4 April 1948 (age 78)
- Education: Winchester College
- Alma mater: Magdalen College, Oxford
- Occupation: Businessman
- Known for: chairman of Associated British Foods
- Spouse: Nicola Bayliss
- Children: 2 sons
- Parent(s): Sir George Sinclair; Katharine Jane Burdekin

Charles James Francis Sinclair CBE FCA (born 4 April 1948) is a British businessman. He is the chairman of Associated British Foods.

== Early life ==
Charles James Francis Sinclair, only son of Sir George Sinclair and Katharine Jane Burdekin, was born on 4 April 1948. He attended Winchester College and graduated from Magdalen College, Oxford.

== Career ==
Sinclair joined the Daily Mail and General Trust in 1975. He was its chief executive officer (CEO) from 1989 to September 2008. He was on the board of directors of the Euromoney Institutional Investor from November 1985 to September 2008, of Thomson Reuters from January 1994 to December 2005, of The Thomson Corporation until December 2005, of Schroders from 1990 to April 2004. He joined the board of directors of Associated British Foods in October 2008 and became its chairman in April 2009. He also sat on the board of directors of SVG Capital since January 2005. He is a Fellow of the Institute of Chartered Accountants in England and Wales.

Sinclair is chairman of the board of trustees of the Minack Theatre in Porthcurno, Cornwall. Sinclair replaced David Clementi as warden of Winchester College in 2014.

== Personal life ==
Sinclair married Nicola Bayliss in 1974. They have two sons. He is a member of the Athenaeum Club, the Flyfishers' Club and Vincent's Club.
