= Bill Huddleston =

English cricketer

William Huddleston (27 February 1873 – 21 May 1962) was an English cricketer active from 1899 to 1914 who played for Lancashire. He was born in Earlestown, Lancashire and died in Warrington. He appeared in 185 first-class matches as a righthanded batsman who bowled right arm off break and medium pace. He scored 2,765 runs with a highest score of 88 and held 150 catches. He took 685 wickets with a best analysis of nine for 36. In his final season, 1914, Lancashire organised a benefit for him in recognition of his long service and this realised £896.

Huddleston's most successful season was 1913 when he took 113 wickets at an average of 19.68. His best innings analysis of nine for 36 was achieved in 1906 against Nottinghamshire at Aigburth. He took 13 wickets in the match and bowled Nottinghamshire out for only 52 in their second innings, enabling Lancashire to win the match by 60 runs.

After the First World War, Huddleston represented Leigh Cricket Club in the Manchester and District Cricket Association until 1925 when he retired from playing. In the 1930 season he stood as an umpire in County Championship matches.
