= Half-blue =

University sporting award

Half-blue is a term used at some universities in the United Kingdom, Australia and New Zealand, which award a "blue" to those who represent them in "full blue" sports and a "half-blue" in some other sports, referred to as "half-blue sports".

== Men's sports ==
See also Categorization of men's sports

Full blue
Boxing, cricket, hockey, football, golf, lawn tennis, table tennis, rowing, rugby union, squash, gymnastics
Full blue (some universities) / Half-blue (the rest)
Athletics, basketball, cross country running, rugby league, swimming, ice hockey
Discretionary full blue
Badminton, canoeing, cycling, dancesport, fencing, judo, lightweight rowing, powerlifting, ice hockey, karate, modern pentathlon, orienteering, rifle shooting (small-bore and full-bore), sailing, skiing, water polo, real tennis and motor racing
Half-blue
American football, Archery, Australian rules football, Eton and Rugby fives, ice hockey, kickboxing, korfball, lacrosse, mountain biking, pistol shooting, polo, rackets, association croquet, clay pigeon shooting, riding, rifle shooting (small-bore and full-bore), volleyball, windsurfing, yachting, handball and mixed lacrosse
Under review at some universities
Gaelic football, chess, tiddlywinks

== Women's sports ==
See also Categorization of men's sports

Full blue – whole team
Boxing, fencing, football, table tennis, hockey, lacrosse, lawn tennis, lightweight rowing, netball, rowing, rugby union, squash, dance.
Full blue (some universities) / Half-blue (the rest)
Athletics, cheerleading, cricket, modern pentathlon, swimming, volleyball, basketball, taekwondo
Discretionary full blue
Badminton, cross-country, cycling, dancesport, golf, gymnastics, ice hockey, judo, karate, orienteering, rifle shooting (full-bore), sailing, skiing, volleyball, boxing, real tennis
Half-blue
Archery, canoeing, canoe polo, cricket, Eton fives, gliding, ice hockey, korfball, lifesaving, orienteering, association croquet, pistol shooting, polo, riding, rifle shooting (small-bore), taekwondo, trampolining, triathlon, windsurfing, water polo, ultimate (if they compete in the Open division), yachting, mixed lacrosse, handball.
Under review at some universities
Windsurfing
