= Blue (university sport) =

Sports award

A blue is an award of sporting colours earned by athletes at some universities and schools for competition at the highest level. The awarding of blues began at Oxford and Cambridge universities in England. They are now awarded at a number of other British universities and at some universities in Australia and New Zealand.

== History ==
The first sporting contest between the universities of Oxford and Cambridge was held on 4 June 1827, when a two-day cricket match at Lord's, organized by Charles Wordsworth, nephew of the poet William, resulted in a draw. There is no record of any university "colours" being worn during the game.

At the first Boat Race in 1829, the Oxford crew was dominated by students of Christ Church, whose college colours were dark blue. They wore white shirts with dark blue stripes, while Cambridge wore white with a pink or scarlet sash. At the second race, in 1836, a light blue ribbon was attached to the front of the Cambridge boat, as it was the colour of Gonville & Caius College. These colours – light blue for Cambridge, and dark blue for Oxford – became the official colours of the two boat clubs, and through the rivalry of the Boat Race, the colours became inextricably linked with the universities and contests between the two.

== University of Cambridge ==
Athletes at the University of Cambridge may be awarded a full blue (or simply a blue), half blue, first team colours or second team colours for competing at the highest level of university sport, which must include being in a varsity match or race against the University of Oxford. A full blue is the highest honour that may be bestowed on a Cambridge athlete, and is a much-coveted and prestigious prize. In general, the full blue standard is approximately that of being successful at a national level of student competition, and the half blue standard is that of being successful at county or regional level.

=== History ===
Once light blue had been chosen as the colour of Cambridge's Boat Club, the other university sport clubs followed suit, though out of courtesy would request permission from the Boat Club before awarding such a "blue". In the 1860s the three senior sports – rowing, cricket and athletics – were awarding blues, and the presidents of each formed an informal "Blues Committee" to oversee such awards. By 1880 a number of smaller clubs involved in varsity matches had successfully requested the right to award "half blues".

=== Awarding process ===
The criteria for awarding blues are different for men and women. Awards are made at the discretion of the men's and women's Blues Committees. The Men's Blues Committee is formed from one representative of each of the full blue sports, and the Women's from one representative of each of the full blue and half blue sports. Each committee meets to discuss issues relating to Cambridge sport.

In some sports with full blue status, the varsity match second team is awarded second team colours.

The awarding of a full blue often requires a person to fulfill a number of requirements in the same academic year, particularly in sports with discretionary full blue status. If, for whatever reason, an exceptional athlete is of or above full blue standard but does not fulfill all the requirements for the 'automatic' award of a full blue in any given year, the committee has the authority to grant an extraordinary full blue to that person subject to scrutiny of the particular case. The individual's case must be presented to the Blues Committee in person and must be backed up by substantial evidence and references. The award is unlikely to be made unless the person is of world-class or at least international standard.

Each sport has specific criteria for each award; the general categorisation of men's and women's sports is laid out below, though the status of each sport is subject to frequent review.

==== Categorisation of men's sports ====
Full blue
Boxing, cricket, hockey, football, golf, lawn tennis, table tennis, rowing, rugby union, squash, gymnastics
Full blue (some) / Half blue (rest)
Athletics, basketball, cross country running, rugby league, swimming, ice hockey
Discretionary full blue
Badminton, canoeing, cycling, dancesport, fencing, judo, lightweight rowing, powerlifting, ice hockey, karate, modern pentathlon, orienteering, rifle shooting (small-bore and full-bore), sailing, skiing, water polo, real tennis and motor racing
Half blue
American football, Archery, Australian rules football, Baseball, Eton and Rugby fives, ice hockey, kickboxing, korfball, lacrosse, mountain biking, pistol shooting, polo, rackets, association croquet, clay pigeon shooting, riding, rifle shooting (small-bore and full-bore), volleyball, windsurfing, yachting, handball and mixed lacrosse
Under review
Gaelic football, chess, tiddlywinks

==== Categorisation of women's sports ====
Full blue – whole team
Boxing, fencing, football, table tennis, hockey, lacrosse, lawn tennis, lightweight rowing, netball, rowing, rugby union, squash, dance.
Full blue (some) / Half blue (rest)
Athletics, cheerleading, cricket, modern pentathlon, swimming, volleyball, basketball, taekwondo
Discretionary full blue
Badminton, cross-country, cycling, dancesport, golf, gymnastics, ice hockey, judo, karate, orienteering, rifle shooting (full-bore), sailing, skiing, volleyball, boxing, real tennis
Half blue
Archery, canoeing, canoe polo, cricket, Eton fives, gliding, ice hockey, korfball, lifesaving, orienteering, association croquet, pistol shooting, polo, riding, rifle shooting (small-bore), taekwondo, trampolining, triathlon, windsurfing, water polo, ultimate (if they compete in the Open division), yachting, mixed lacrosse, handball.
Under review
Windsurfing

=== Regalia ===
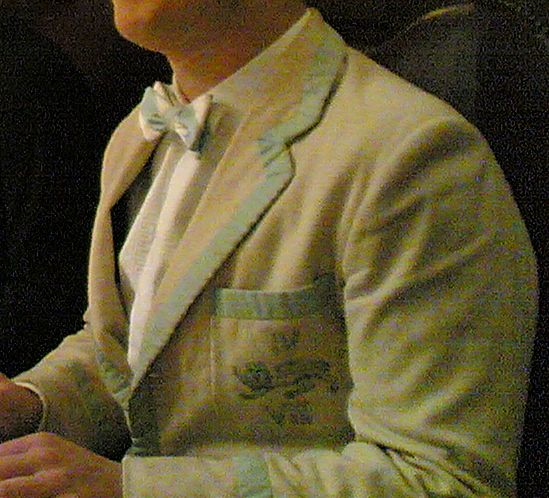
Cambridge University Rifle Association half blue blazer and bow tie

The winner of a blue or half blue is entitled to wear a blues blazer, which is one of the most recognisable and distinctive garments associated with Cambridge University. Full blue blazers are completely coloured Cambridge Blue. Half blue blazers have a number of different designs, depending on the wearer's sport; a typical design is an off-white blazer with Cambridge blue lapels and trimmings. There is a variety of other blue and half blue paraphernalia, including scarves, ties, pullovers, bow ties, caps and squares.

As of May 2011, the colour recognised by the university as Cambridge Blue has a slight green tint.

=== Hawks' Club/Ospreys ===
Men holding blues, half blues or second team colours in a Full blue sport are eligible to join the Hawks' Club. Women holding any of these awards are eligible to join The Ospreys, which was founded in 1985. In 2019, the Hawks and Ospreys finalized an agreement to share usage of the Hawks' Clubhouse.

== University of Oxford ==
=== Administration ===
At the University of Oxford, the committee for awarding blues and half blues work on much the same principles as the Cambridge committees. The principal difference between the two men's committees is that, at Oxford, all captains, regardless of their status as full, discretionary, or half blue must attend meetings of the committee.

Until recently, the voting was broken up according to blues status with full blue captains being allowed to vote on all matters while all the other captains could only vote on matters directly relating to half blue sports. In Michaelmas Term 2006, the committee finally allowed discretionary full blue captains the right to vote on matters directly relating to discretionary full blue sports.

The committees are administered by an elected president, secretary and treasurer who serve one year. Unlike at Cambridge, where the president of Cambridge University Boat Club holds the position, at Oxford, any captain can be elected president, regardless of sport or status.

The role of the president is to call and serve as chair of any meeting of the committee, of which there are normally three per year (six for the women). They also serve as the representative of the committee and sit on the University Sports Strategy Committee and the executive committee of the Sports Federation. Both Presidents along with the Director of Sport represent Oxford at any meetings of a Joint Blues Committee held with Cambridge. The purpose of the Joint Blues Committee is to discuss issues of eligibility for the varsity match and to settle any disputes between the sporting communities of the two universities.

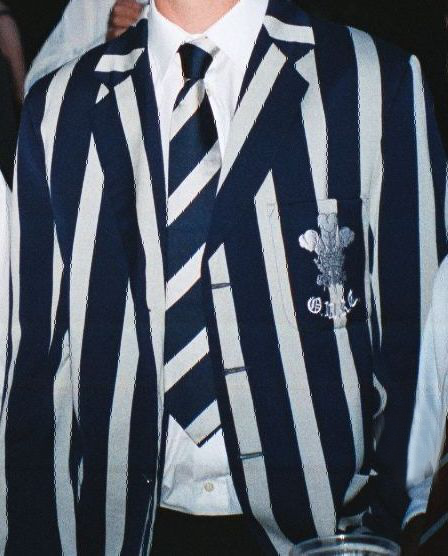
Oxford University Rifle Club half blue blazer and tie

=== Costume ===
The colour of an Oxford full blue blazer is dark blue. The Oxford half blue blazer can be one of two designs. Either it is composed of thick vertical stripes of dark blue and off-white, as in the adjacent image, or it can be dark blue, as the full blue blazer, with two white stripes above the club badge on the left breast. In recent times, the striped blazer is being superseded by the dark blue blazer due to issues of cost. However, the striped blazer remains popular among the shooting sports, and a handful of others, due to its design first being associated with the rifle half blue. Members of Oxford University Rifle Club affectionately refer to this striped blazer as a 'stripey'.

=== Clubs ===
The club associated with the Oxford blue is Vincent’s Club, although its membership is not restricted to blues, and there are wider criteria for election. Atalantas is a club for sportswomen at Oxford, and also is not restricted to blues.

== Other British universities ==
A number of other British universities, particularly in Scotland, award blues as their colours. These include Aberdeen, Bath, Birmingham, Edinburgh, Glasgow, Heriot-Watt, Queen's University Belfast, , Liverpool, Robert Gordon, St. Andrews and Stirling.

The Victoria University of Manchester awarded 'Maroons' in place of the usual Blues, the Athletic Union having chosen the sporting colours of maroon and white in 1905.

== Trinity College Dublin, the University of Dublin ==
Trinity has a sporting tradition, and the college has 50 sports clubs affiliated to the Dublin University Central Athletic Club (DUCAC). The Central Athletic Club is made up of five committees that oversee the development of sport in the college: the executive committee, which is responsible overall for all activities; the Captains' Committee, which represents the 49 club captains and awards University Colours (Pinks); the Pavilion Bar Committee, which runs the private members' bar; the Pavilion Members' Committee; and the Sports Facilities Committee.

== 'Blues' in Australia ==
=== University of Adelaide ===
Adelaide University Sport at the University of Adelaide in Adelaide, South Australia awards a blue and a half blue for outstanding sporting achievement, and a club letters for both sporting achievement and service.

=== La Trobe University ===
La Trobe University has awarded blues and half blues since its early years, with the first blues being awarded in 1968. The annual Blues and Sports Awards Night recognises the elite sports men and women who have represented La Trobe via the university's clubs, intervarsity sporting competitions and the World University games. There are also awards for Outstanding Service which recognise the outstanding service to sports clubs by members of the La Trobe Community.

=== University of Melbourne ===
The Melbourne University Sports Association (originally known as the 'Sports Union') awards blues and half blues at the University of Melbourne, for outstanding performance in inter-university events (primarily through the Australian University Games and Australian University Championships). A 'distinguished service award' may be made (including to non-students) for outstanding service to a sporting club (or clubs), the Sports Association, and/or sport at the university generally.

Blues were first awarded in 1904, as one of the first items of business of the newly formed Sports Union, with retrospective awards made back as early as 1870. Initially, awards were made automatically to all participants in an intervarsity contest, with the level (full or half blue) dependent on the sport. In 1911, this model was replaced with the formation of a 'Blues Advisory Board' to determine the awards based on an individual's performance. The BAB continues to serve this role today.

=== University of Queensland ===
Blues and half-blues have been awarded at the University of Queensland since 1912. Blues have been awarded for outstanding performances in club fixtures, representative games, and inter-university competitions as well as for international representation whilst studying at the university. The University of Queensland blue is the highest sporting accolade an athlete can receive from the university. In recent years, UQ Sport through its Blues Advisory Committee, has developed a selection method and criteria to ensure that blues and half blues at the university are of the highest standard. Each year these awards are presented at the UQ Sport Blues Awards Dinner.

== 'Blues' in New Zealand ==
Since 1919 the New Zealand Universities Blue has been awarded to NZ University students who have achieved excellence both on and off the field of play. Currently University Sport New Zealand is responsible for presenting this award.

In addition, individual universities will award their own blues. For example, University of Otago blues date from 1907, therefore pre-dating the New Zealand Universities blue.

== See also ==
- List of British and Irish varsity matches
- Varsity letter – similar award granted by schools in the United States
