= The Eclipse Inn =

Historic public house in Hampshire, England

Coordinates: 51°03′44″N 1°18′53″W

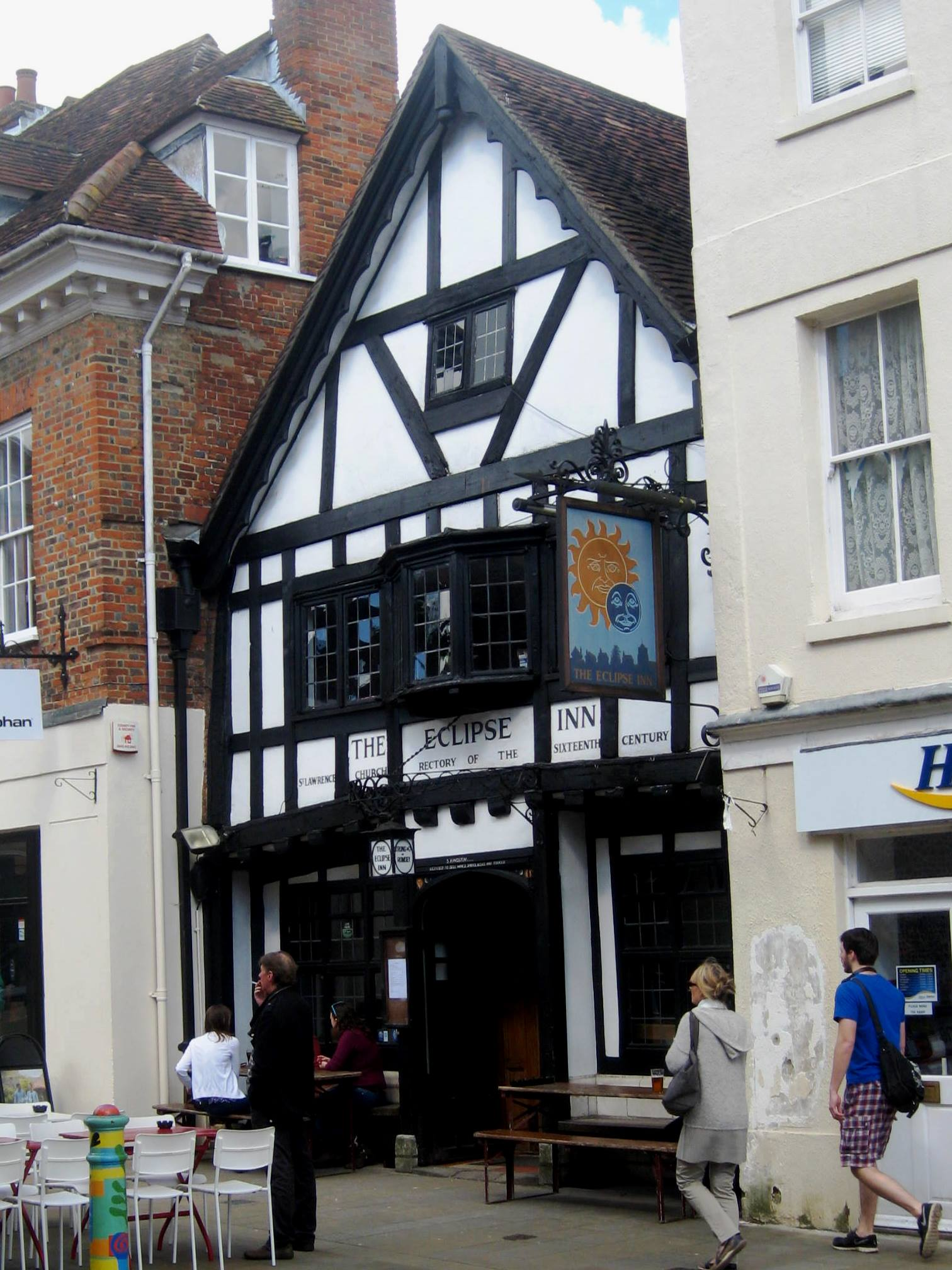
The Eclipse Inn in 2016

The Eclipse Inn is a public house at 25 The Square in the city of Winchester in Hampshire, England. It has been listed Grade II on the National Heritage List for England (NHLE) since January 1974. The building dates from the 16th century and was formerly the rectory of St Lawrence Church. The name of the pub derives from its siting opposite the Sun Inn.

It has been included in CAMRA's Good Beer Guide, edited by Roger Protz.

The NHLE listing describes the inn as "Very modernized". It is framed with timber over three storeys, with a seven-light casement window with wood mullions. The timber framing was rediscovered in the 1920s after the removal of plaster that covered it. The Eclipse Inn is the last of a group of listed buildings that form 10 to 25 The Square.
