= Henry Dison Gabell =

Henry Dison Gabell (1764–1831) was headmaster of Winchester College.

== Biography ==
Gabell was the son of the Rev. Timothy Gabell of Winchester. Gabell was born at Winchester in 1764, and was elected a scholar of Winchester College in 1779. He studied at New College, Oxford, where he matriculated on 11 October 1782, graduated BA on 8 July 1786, and held a fellowship from 1782 to 1790.

Soon afterwards he was appointed master of Warminster School, where he had twenty boys to teach, with a salary of £30, and liberty to take private pupils. He was presented to the rectory of St Lawrence Church, Winchester, in 1788, and was appointed second master of Winchester College in 1793. He graduated MA at Cambridge University in 1807, and succeeded William Stanley Goddard as headmaster of Winchester College in 1810. He was presented to the rectory of Ashow, Warwickshire, in 1812, and that of Binfield, Berkshire, in 1820. He resigned the headmastership of Winchester College in December 1823, receiving a present of plate richly engraved from the scholars. He continued to hold the three livings of Binfield, Ashow, and St Lawrence until his death, which took place at Binfield on 18 April 1831.

== Personal life ==
Gabell married, on 11 January 1790, Miss Gage, the daughter of a clergyman of Holton, Oxfordshire. Their third daughter, Maria, married, on 18 July 1818, the Rev. William Scott, Rector of Aldridge, Staffordshire, the second son of Sir Joseph Scott, 1st Baronet, of Great Barr Hall, Staffordshire.

== Scholarly work ==
Gabell was a friend and correspondent of Samuel Parr, in the seventh volume of whose works some letters of his on points of classical scholarship will be found.

He published:

- A pamphlet entitled 'On the Expediency of Altering and Amending the Regulations recommended by Parliament for Reducing the High Price of Corn: and of Extending the Bounty on the Importation of Wheat and other Articles of Provision,’ London, 1796, 8vo.
- 'A discourse delivered on the fast-day in February 1799', London, 1799, 8vo.
