= Fives =

English handball sport

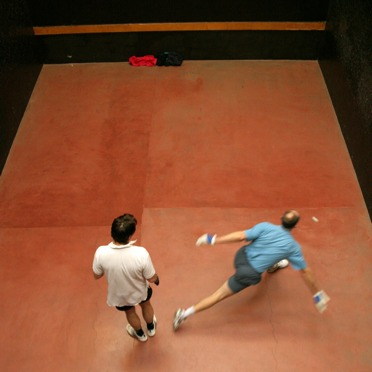
- A game of Rugby fives in progress
- Highest governing body: Rugby Fives Association, Eton Fives Association
- Registered players: <4,000 (estimated)

Characteristics
- Contact: No
- Team members: Singles, Doubles
- Mixed-sex: Yes
- Equipment: Fives ball, fives glove

Presence
- Country or region: Commonwealth countries, in particular the United Kingdom

Fives (historically known as hand-tennis) is an English handball sport derived from jeu de paume, similar to the games of Gaelic handball, Basque pelota, and squash. The game is played in both singles and doubles teams, in an either three- or four-sided court.

== Etymology ==
The origin of the name "fives" for the game is uncertain, but two main theories are commonly presented. The first is that it is derived from the slang expression "a bunch of fives" (meaning a fist); the other that an earlier form of the game, as described by Nichols, used five-a-side teams.

== History ==
Fives is generally considered to have originated from early forms of the French Jeu de paume. Games were most often played against the walls of the north ends of churchyards, or against the walls of belltowers. This often damaged window glazing, so many churches adapted their exteriors to protect against the game. This often came in the form of shutters and pintles inserted into walls, as well as latticework over the windows themselves. The sport also influenced the layout of several churches; at some churches, saplings were planted where Fives would have been played, at the Church of St James, Ashwick, a cross was moved "to the Vifes place ... to prevent the Young People from spending so much idle time in that sort of exercise."

As such, many of the earliest written testaments of the game are directives by clergy taken to prevent playing of the game. Actions against the game (then referred to as either "hand-tennis" and "hand-ball") have been found as early as 1287, when the Synod of Exeter banned the game due to the damage it caused to church buildings. Other notable examples of wall ball games being banned include Robert Braybrooke, Bishop of London, who in 1385 prohibited the game "Necnon ad pilam infra et extra ecclesiam ludunt." (English: Let them play ball neither inside nor outside the church.)

The name "fives" was applied to the game by 1591, as when Elizabeth I visited the village of Elvetham in Hampshire, she was entertained by the Marquess of Hertford by a game played by his servants:

"about three o'clock, ten of his lordship's servants, all Somersetshire men, in a square greene court before her majesties windowe, did hang up lines, squaring out the forme of a tennis-court, and making a cross line in the middle; in this square they (being stript out of their dublets) played five to five with hand-ball at bord and cord as they tearme it, to the great liking of her highness" – John Nichols, The Progresses and Public Processions of Queen Elizabeth, Volume II.

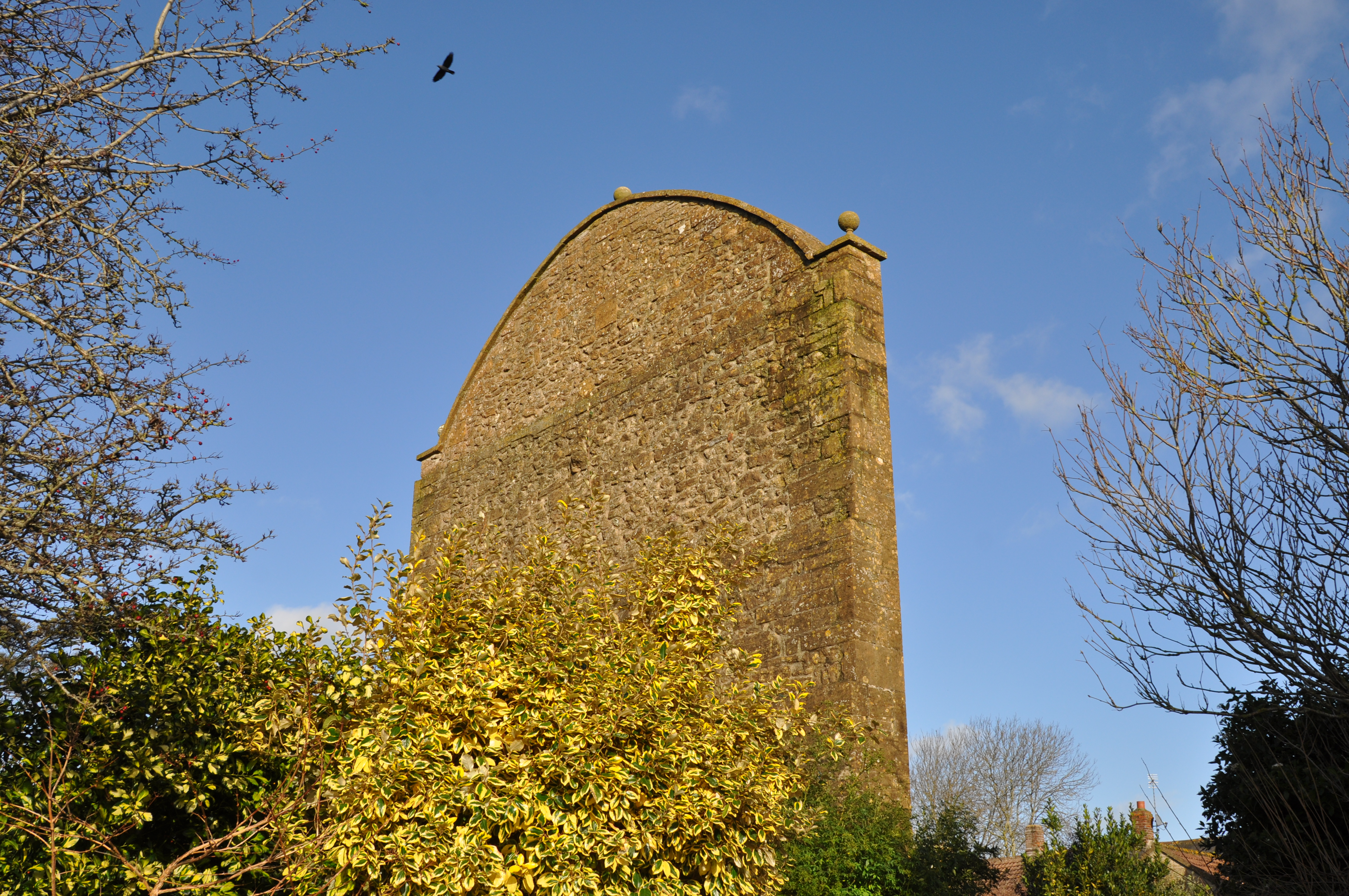
Fives wall in South Petherton, Somerset

The version of fives played here is an example of Wessex fives, the common ancestor to all modern fives games. The first known fives court was built at the base of the church tower in West Pennard, Somerset, in 1813. By this time, fives had achieved some popularity in Wales, where it was referred to as "Ffeifs" – many courts and matches were referred to as "fives courts", although whether these were for playing Welsh handball is unclear.

In the beginning of the 19th century, fives was played as a pub game especially in Somerset, and many courts were built alongside pubs, attracting large numbers of spectators. Gambling was often present at these matches. The courts at these pubs were different from those used later in the century, consisting of a free standing wall (which were, as such, referred to as either "fives walls" or "fives towers"), occasionally with a buttress attached.

During this period, John Cavanagh, reputed to be the greatest fives player of all time, gained popularity. However, after around 1855, the sport experienced a serious loss of players, due to the prominence of other "more sophisticated" sports, such as squash, and was seen as old-fashioned due to its agrarian roots. As described the Badminton Library:

The number of those who continue fives players after the age of twenty-five is very small; and, for obvious reasons, these veterans are usually schoolmasters. Again, fives is entirely a game for amateurs. It has no professors who make their living and their renown as its teachers or exponents. It has no matches to be reported in newspapers with a minuteness of detail suitable to events of international importance. No fives player, as such, has ever had his portrait published in an illustrated journal, or has had the meanest article of dress in the hosiers' shops named after him. Indeed, the game is not one that tends to exalt the individual player.

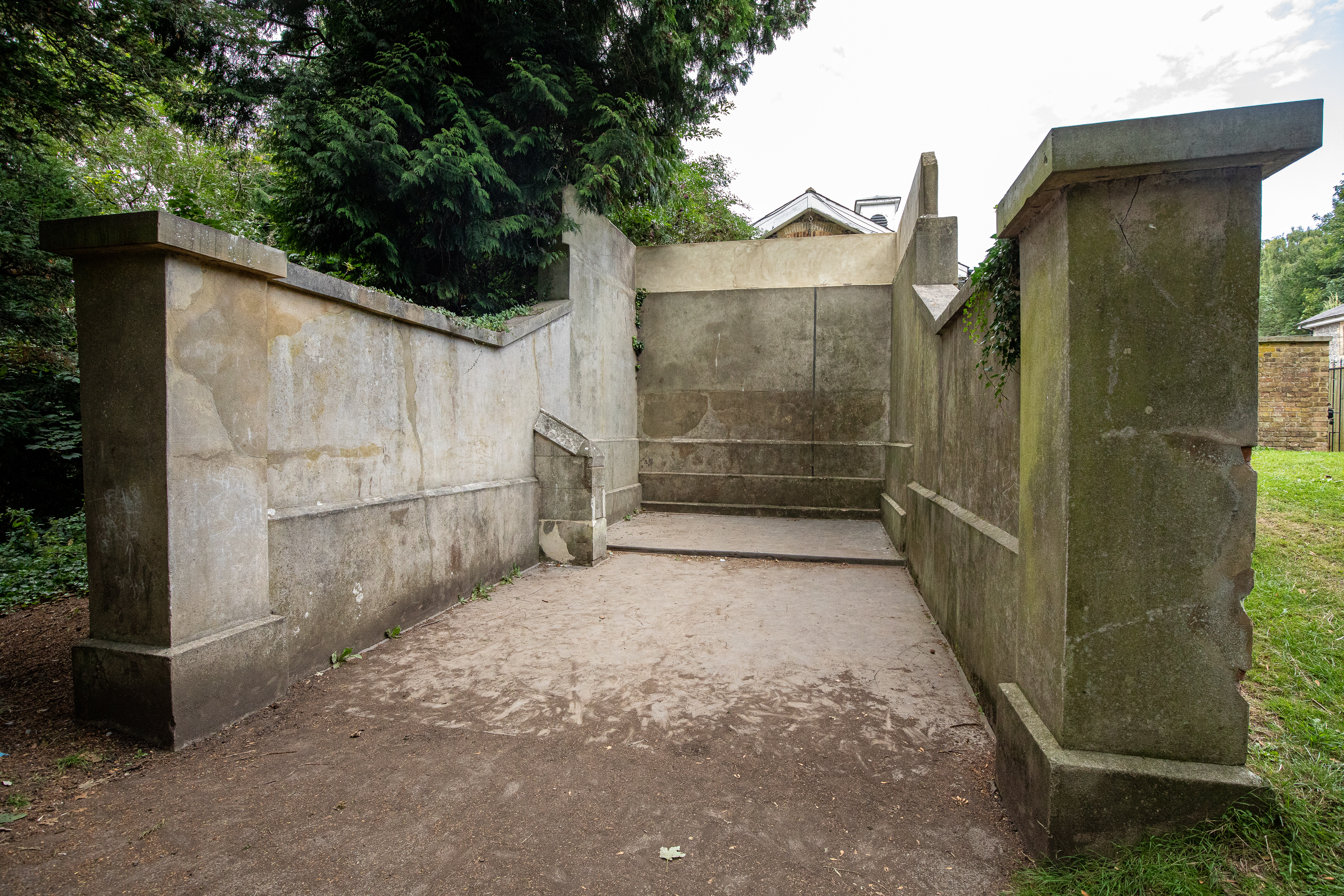
Fives courts at Eton

At the end of the 19th century, fives was gentrified from its origins as a rural sport to an elitist sport at public schools; codified forms of the game such as Eton fives and Rugby fives were introduced in the 1870s, which spread to schools such as Highgate, Westminster, Charterhouse and Harrow. By the end of the 19th Century, fives had become a well-established sport for British public schools. In the 1920s, the sport began to be played at Cambridge University. The first recorded fives match was played between Eton and Harrow in 1885 (F. Thomas and C. Barclay of Eton beat E. M. Butler and B. R. Warren of Harrow).

Fives continued to be played through the 20th century, but failed to develop a large nation standing. This was because it had a tradition of being a recreational sport played in free time, the large number of varieties of the game in play, and because the "more sophisticated" game of rackets was already established.

== Variants ==
Fives court at Abingdon School

Several regional varieties of fives exist; however, most games played are either Rugby fives or Eton fives. Of the two, Etonian fives is the older, being played since the 17th century. The two major variants of the game differ primarily in the construction of the court, with Eton fives including a buttress and a step inside the court, and an open back wall.

Other variants of the game include Warminster and Winchester fives; Winchester fives has similarities to both Rugby and Etonian fives in regards to court construction, while Warminster fives dates to the late 18th century, and uses a specialised set of rules. The majority of fives-playing schools have only one type of court, although three schools have historically had both Eton and Rugby courts: Cheltenham, Dover, and Marlborough.

=== Eton fives ===
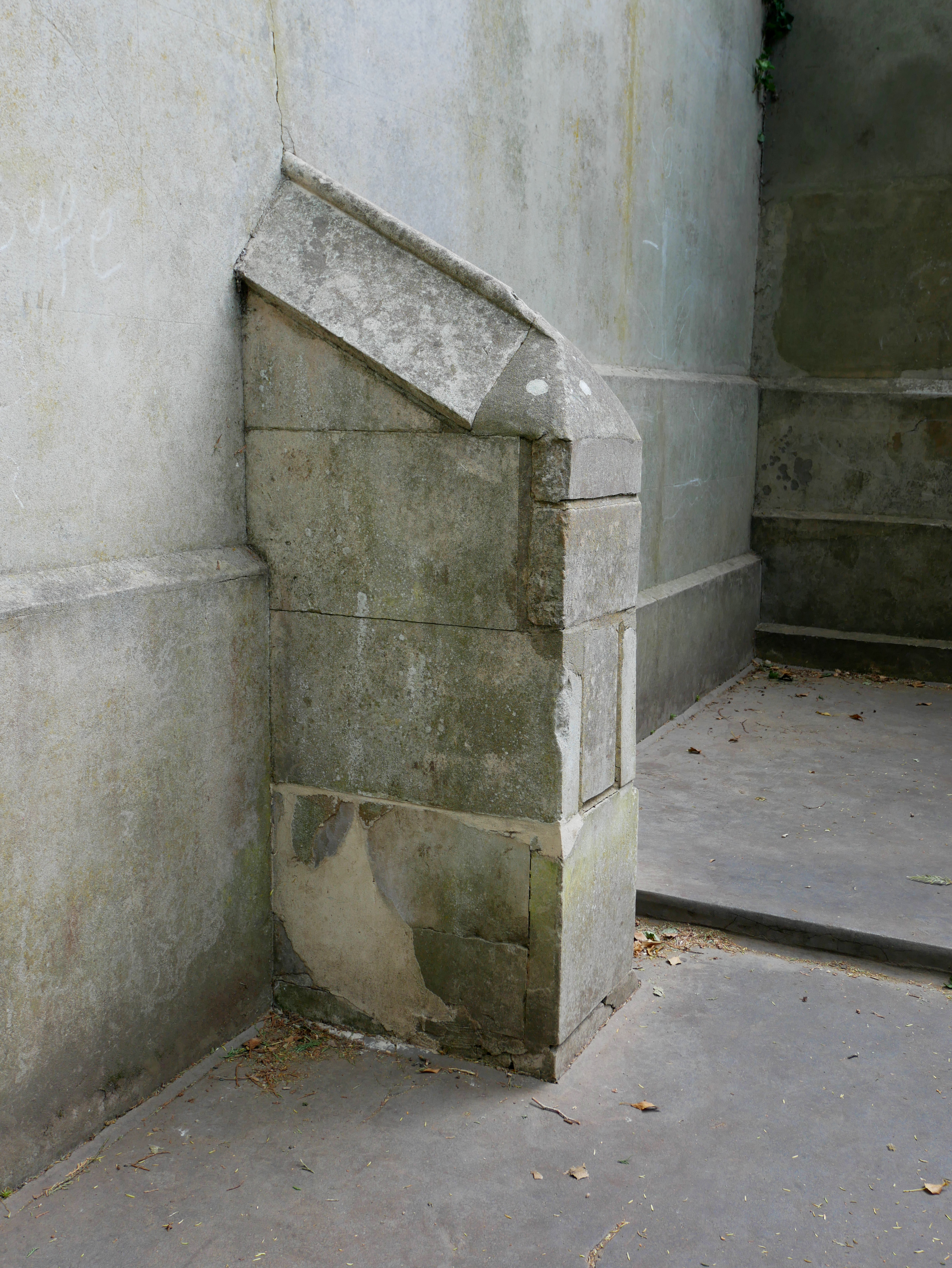
A buttress at the High Elms Country Park Eton fives courts

Eton fives is a form of the game which, unlike Rugby fives, is played only in doubles form. The sport was first created at Eton College (hence the name) by boys playing handball between two buttresses of the school chapel with rules for the game being created in 1877 under the title "Rules of the Game of Fives as played at Eton".

Eton fives is played in three-sided courts around the size of a squash court mimicking the sides of the school chapel, with a buttress (referred to as a "pepper-box") on the left-hand wall, and a raised step at the front of the court, extending around 80 cm into the court, at a height of 15 cm, creating the "upper" and "lower" parts of the court. A sloping ledge runs around the walls of the court, roughly four and a half feet from the floor, of which the bottom line is dubbed the "playline", above which shots have to be played. The upper limit of the court is the "coping" – stonework that lines the top of the walls.

The first purpose-built fives courts were built at Eton College in 1840, by then headmaster Edward Craven Hawtrey, who constructed four courts mimicking the sides of the school chapel. These courts varied in a few specifications; the distance between the front wall and the buttress was increased, and the floor's slope was reduced, which quickened play speed. The courts were built of sandstone, to reproduce the effect's of the chapel's walls, which are made of Taynton stone.

The first Eton fives match was played on 12 February 1885, between Eton and Harrow School, playing at Harrow's fives courts. Eton fives began to be played at the University of Cambridge in 1920, with varsity matches beginning in 1927. The sport is regulated by the Eton Fives Association, which promotes the sport and runs tournaments annually. While Eton fives has historically been a male-dominated game, due to the public schools it was played in being single-sex, in recent years, women have begun to take a larger role in the sport, accounting for approximately 20% of games played as of 2016.

=== Rugby fives ===
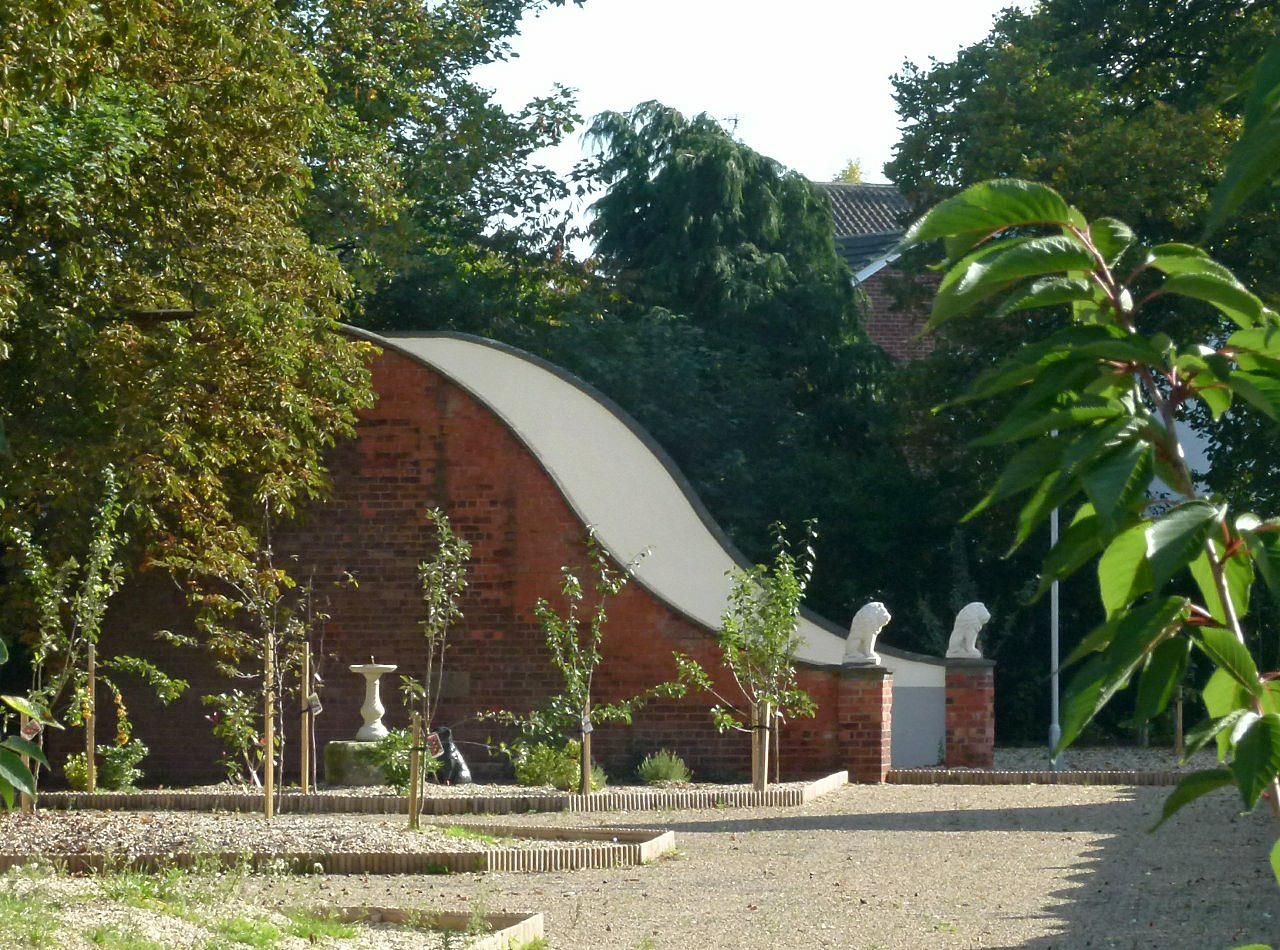
Rugby fives court in Retford, Nottinghamshire (Grade II listed)

Rugby fives, nominally developed at Rugby School in Rugby is the most common variant of the sport, played in both singles and doubles. The variant is derived from Wessex fives, and was brought to Rugby in the 19th century by Thomas Arnold, the then headmaster of Rugby School, who had learnt the game playing at Warminster School. Rugby fives is attested to in Thomas Hughes' 1857 Tom Brown's School Days, centered on the author's own experiences at Rugby, which align with the period in with Arnolds was headmaster. The sport is governed by the Rugby Fives Association, which stages multiple tournaments for the sport annually.

Rugby fives uses an enclosed court free from "hazards", with a hollow board running across the front wall, similar to that of squash. The court has a width of 18 feet and a length of 28 feet, with the front wall having a height of 15 feet. The Rugby fives court uses a shortened back wall, which has a height of 4'10''. Rugby fives is most commonly played in gloves, using a leather-clad ball with a rubber core. This ball is harder than that used in Eton fives, which increases the speed of play in the game.

Fives is played at several public schools throughout England, including Rugby School, Bedford School, and St Paul's School (London), as well as by the universities of Oxford and Cambridge, which participate in an annual varsity match in the sport. As of 2022, Rugby fives is played in two state schools, namely Stoke Newington School (whose courts were renovated by The National Lottery in 2007) and Derby Moor Academy. Wigan Grammar School had a Rugby fives court situated on the Mesnes playing field. It fell into disuse after 1972 when WGS became a comprehensive school. The court became dilapidated and was demolished in the 1980s.

=== Winchester fives ===
Winchester fives is a version of fives very similar to Rugby fives, played originally at Winchester College The court used is almost identical to that used in Rugby fives, except for a 45° change in wall direction for almost 10 inches on the left wall. This makes the back of the court narrower, and creates a very small buttress similarly to that of Eton fives. This buttress also serves to diversify gameplay by allowing winning shots to be made more easily: sharp changes in direction are created by bouncing the ball off the buttress. The game is played in doubles, with matches being played to either 11 or 15 points.

The sport has no organisation of its own, but The Schools' Winchester Fives Doubles tournament is run yearly by the Rugby Fives Association.

=== Warminster fives ===
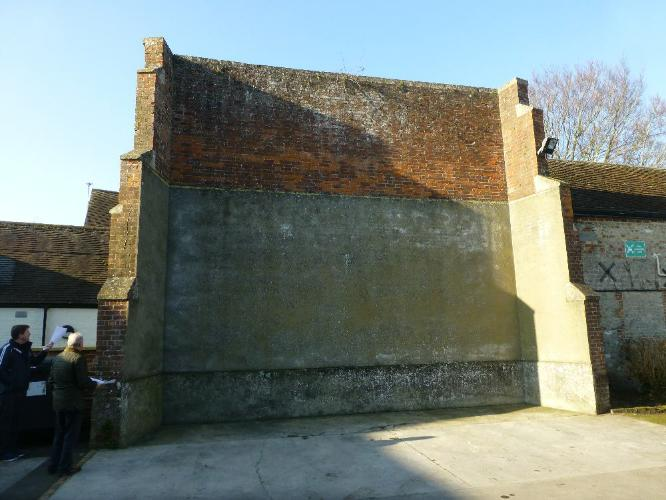
Fives court at Warminster School

Warminster fives, also known as West Country fives, is played at Lord Weymouth School, now Warminster School. An 1860 fives court still stands at the school and was in regular use until the 1970s. The court used in Warminster fives is unique in its construction: the court is similar to a fives wall, except for two small walls jutting from the front wall at 45° angles. The court itself is a grade II listed building, first being listed in 1978.

Warminster fives is likely to have inspired Rugby fives: Thomas Arnold, headmaster at Rugby responsible for the introduction of the sport at the school was previously a teacher at Warminster before joining Rugby.

The Warminster variety of fives also differs greatly in its rules: teams play three-a-side; one on the left, center and right sides of the court (referred to as "squif", "centre" and "skunk"). The court has dimensions of roughly 8 metres in width and depth.

=== Bat fives ===
External image
- Fives-bat used to play Bat fives. Held at the Radley School Archives.

Bat fives is a form of fives predating Rugby, Eton, and Winchester forms of the game. It is very similar to the game of rackets, and can even be considered an early form of the game, differing in the shape of the bat used, and the slightly smaller ball used in rackets. The game was played using a willow bat with a curved bowl, measuring around 21 inches by 4 inches, with the end wrapped in leather.

Bat fives was played mostly at Radley and Westminster, but was also played at Rugby, Cheltenham, and Aldenham. It used courts similar in size to squash courts, with an open back, and with no buttress, step or hazards. The sport ceased to be played around 1903, in favour of Eton fives, and most courts were demolished in the 1920s.

When playing, a line was drawn on the ground around 10 feet in front of the front wall. Games were then played to either fifteen or twenty-five points. The 1914 book Three Hundred Things a Bright Boy Can Do describes gameplay as:

The first player takes the ball, and strikes it against the wall with his bat above the line on the wall, and so that it may fall outside of the line on the ground. The other then strikes it, and the players then continue to hit it against the wall, either before it comes to the ground or at the first rebound, until one of them missing it, or driving it out of bounds, or beneath the wall-line, loses or goes out. The ball may fall anywhere within the side boundaries, after once being struck up by the player who is in.

== Courts and equipment ==
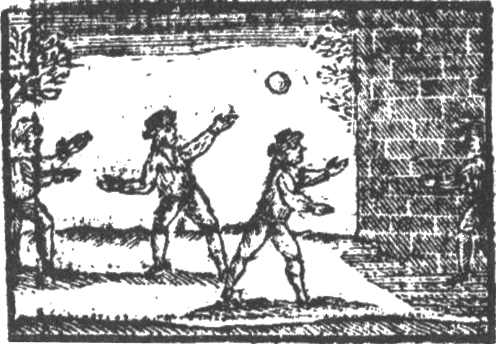
A woodcut lithograph of a game of Fives in progress found in A Little Pretty Children's Book

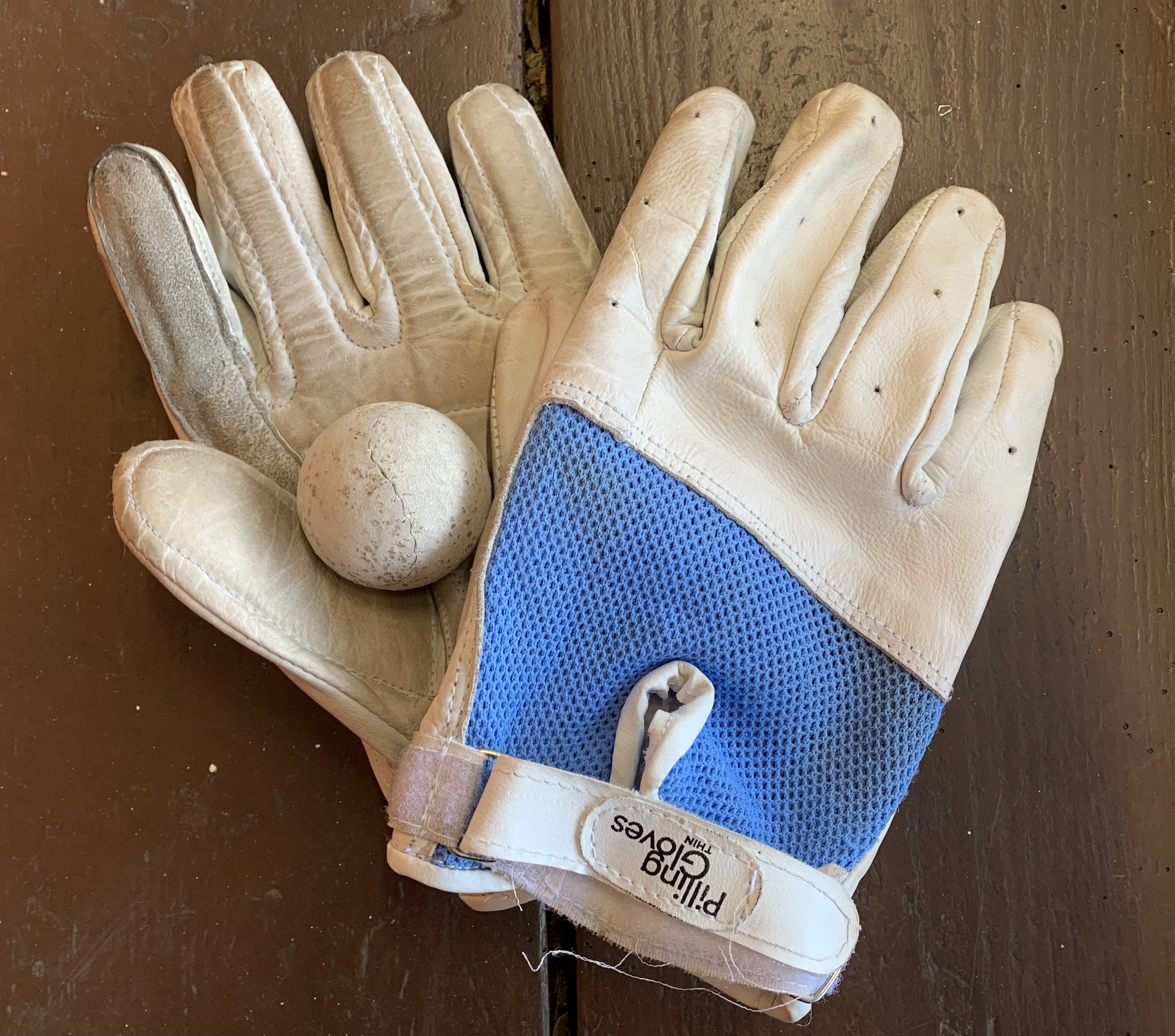
A modern pair of Fives Gloves with standard leather match ball

Fives is generally played wearing leather gloves. The practice of which dates from the 18th Century – in John Newbery's 1744 children's book A Little Pretty Pocket-Book, two fives players can be seen wearing white gloves on their right hands. The balls used in fives generally weigh around an ounce and a quarter, and vary in material – leather and rubber are most commonly used.

As shown before, court dimensions vary greatly between different versions of Fives; however, modern day court construction is relatively uniform. Two main types of courts exist; traditional ones, and pre-cast courts. Traditional courts are built by bricklaying a form, which is then coated in a cement render, which consists of concrete and sharp sand (alternatively grus), which is then coated in Keene's cement plaster. Precast concrete courts are also available, which are more cost-effective, and faster to build (traditional courts take 4–5 months, concrete courts can be erected in weeks) than traditional courts.

== Players ==
=== Europe ===
There are some well-established clubs overseas, such as the Zuoz Fives Club in Zürich, Switzerland, and legendary players like Edoardo D'Arpa and Stephan Gorbokon are currently living in Zurich, as well.

=== Africa ===
Eton fives is the only version of Fives played in the north of Nigeria, and is especially popular in Katsina State, being more popular in Nigeria than in England itself. The sport was introduced in 1928 by former Eton pupil J. S. Hogden, who was teaching in the state of Katsina (in the Provincial Secondary School) and in Birnin Kebbi. The version of the game in Nigeria is played using a tennis ball, as traditional balls "take chunks out of the mud walls of the courts", and gloves are not used. In Nigeria, fives is popular; the Emir of Katsina, Abdulmumini Kabir Usman plays, and has a court inside the Gidan Korau Katsina Royal Palace.

Fives in Nigeria is regulated by the Fives Federation of Nigeria Several inter-state tournaments are run, which include the Sardauna cup and Dan-Iyan Zazzau Super Cup. The organisation also works to popularise the sport in Southern Nigeria.

The Eton Fives Association has run multiple tours in conjunction with the Nigerian Fives Association to Nigeria to play the sport: one in 1965, and a second in December 1984 (after which the Nigerian Fives Association visited England), and most recently, a second tour by Nigerian players in 2019.

=== Oceania ===
Fives was played in schools and universities in Australia in the nineteenth century. A court was opened at the Hutchins School in Hobart, Tasmania, in November 1877, The court was described as "the only one, we believe, in the colony", and its dimensions as: "Length of floor, 21 ft.; height and width of court 14 ft. each. The court will be an open one, with a flagged floor, the walls will be built of brick, and cemented on the inside."

The erection of a fives court on the Recreation Ground of the University of Melbourne is noted in the Council minutes of Trinity College in 1873, and there were newspaper reports of an "annual tournament in connexion with the University Fives Club" in 1881, when Professor Herbert Strong acted as judge. A double-handed tournament and a single-handed handicap tournament were played there in August 1883.

Fives is played in some secondary schools in New Zealand, for example Nelson College, New Zealand's oldest state school.

=== Asia ===
Eton fives is played in Malaysia, being introduced to Malay College Kuala Kangsar by Charles Ernest Bazell, the school's Oxfordian fourth headmaster, in 1923. Two Eton fives courts exist, reopened in 2014, after 50 years of disuse. These courts are speculated to have been the first in the country; however, a report by The Straits Times from 30 April 1920 references fives courts at the Padang Polo (polo ground) in Penang. Eton Fives teams from Malaysia have been entered into tournaments – in March 2015, two teams were sent to the UK National Eton Fives Schools Championship at Eton College, reaching the Plate Quarter Finals.

In India, Eton fives is played only at St. Paul's School, Darjeeling, where there exist two courts built in 1899 by the brother of one of the school's former rectors as a gift to the school. Courts also exist in Kodaikanal, as well as at the Laxmi Vilas Palace, but these are not in use.

=== Americas ===
Fives has been played in the United States since the 18th century, first attested to in a by-law in Pittsfield, Massachusetts in 1791, where several forms of ball games were prohibited from being played within eighty yards of the town hall to protect its windows.

The Racquet Club of Philadelphia built a set of Fives Courts in 1900, but these were quickly used for playing squash. Fives courts also existed at the old location of the Racquet and Tennis Club in New York City before it relocated in 1918, as well as at the Chicago Athletic Association. Fives has received little attention in America since the early 20th century; however, American handball players such as Timothy Gonzalez and Mathieu Pelletier have brought attention to fives by playing it.

Like in England, fives was also played in prestigious preparatory schools, most notably Groton School and St. Mark's School, Massachusetts. Of these, only Groton still plays, where three Rugby fives courts, built in 1884 by Endicott Peabody, are in use as of 2016. Until 2001, eight courts had existed at St. Mark's School, Massachusetts, built by William Greenough Thayer, and an annual competition between the two schools was held until at least the 1980s. In March 1979, a tour of England was made by players from St. Mark's School, the first ever by American players. Several other courts exist scattered throughout the country, for example one near Kezar Lake, and another at the Union Boat Club in Boston.

In 2021, Mexico's first Eton Fives court was built in Oaxaca by Emilian Ruiz Ayala, a player who learnt the sport at the Lyceum Alpinum Zuoz. Fives also has a history in Brazil, several fives courts were built by the Western and Brazilian Telegraph Company, although these were closed in the late 1920s. Courts also existed at the São Paulo Athletic Club, which were eventually converted into a swimming pool. Finally, a set of fives courts were built at St Paul's School in São Paulo in 1934.

Bat fives was played in Uruguay at the Montevideo Cricket Club, where there were two courts.

== See also ==
- GAA Handball

== Literature ==
- Egerton, David (31 May 2013). Eton and Rugby Five – A Complete Handbook of Practical Advice, Instruction and Rules. Read Books Ltd. ISBN 978-1-4733-8313-5.
