= William Stanley Goddard =

William Stanley Goddard (9 October 1757 – 10 October 1845) was an English schoolmaster and Church of England clergyman, headmaster of Winchester College from 1793 to 1809.

A son of John Goddard, gentleman, of Stepney, Middlesex, Goddard matriculated at Merton College, Oxford, on 17 December 1776, aged nineteen. He graduated BA in 1781 and MA in 1783. In 1784 he was appointed as a schoolmaster at Winchester College and in 1793 was promoted to headmaster. In 1795 he was awarded the further Oxford degrees of Bachelor and Doctor of Divinity.

In 1809, Goddard left Winchester to take up Church of England benefices. He was Rector of Kingston, Isle of Wight, a living which he resigned in 1827; later Rector of Bepton, Sussex, a prebendary of St Paul's Cathedral and of Salisbury, and Vicar of Wherwell, Hampshire. He was offered the Vicarage of Kensington, but turned it down.

Goddard died on 10 October 1845, aged 88. At the time of his death, Goddard was living in Andover and Cadogan Place, Chelsea. His will was proved in November, when it was reported that he had left 1,000 (equivalent to £124,961 in 2023) to the churchwardens of Andover for the repairs of the parish church and another £1,000 for the poor of the town.

== Notes ==
Academic offices
Preceded by Joseph Warton	Headmaster of Winchester College; 1793–1809	Succeeded by Henry Dison Gabell
