= List of University of Oxford people in education =

This is a list of people from the University of Oxford involved in education. Many were students at one (or more) of the colleges of the University, and others held fellowships at a college. Some are known for their involvement in schools, including Thomas Arnold, Headmaster of Rugby School and Anthony Chenevix-Trench, Headmaster of Eton College. Others for their work with universities or educational administration, such as Lord Butterworth, the founding Vice-Chancellor of University of Warwick. University professors and lecturers who are primarily known for their work in their specialist field are found in other lists. This list forms part of a series of lists of people associated with the University of Oxford – for other lists, please see the main article List of University of Oxford people.

== List ==
- Hugh Catchpole (Founder Principal Cadet College Hasan Abdal, Principal Rashtriya Indian Military College, Pakistan Air Force Public School Sargodha
- Tristram Jones-Parry (Christ Church) Headmaster of Westminster School 1998–2005
- Alan Aldous (Jesus) Headmaster King's School, Pontefract 1959–70, Leeds Grammar School 1970–75
- Eric Anderson (Lincoln) Headmaster Abingdon 1970–75, Shrewsbury 1975–80, Eton 1980–94; Rector Lincoln College, Oxford 1994–2000

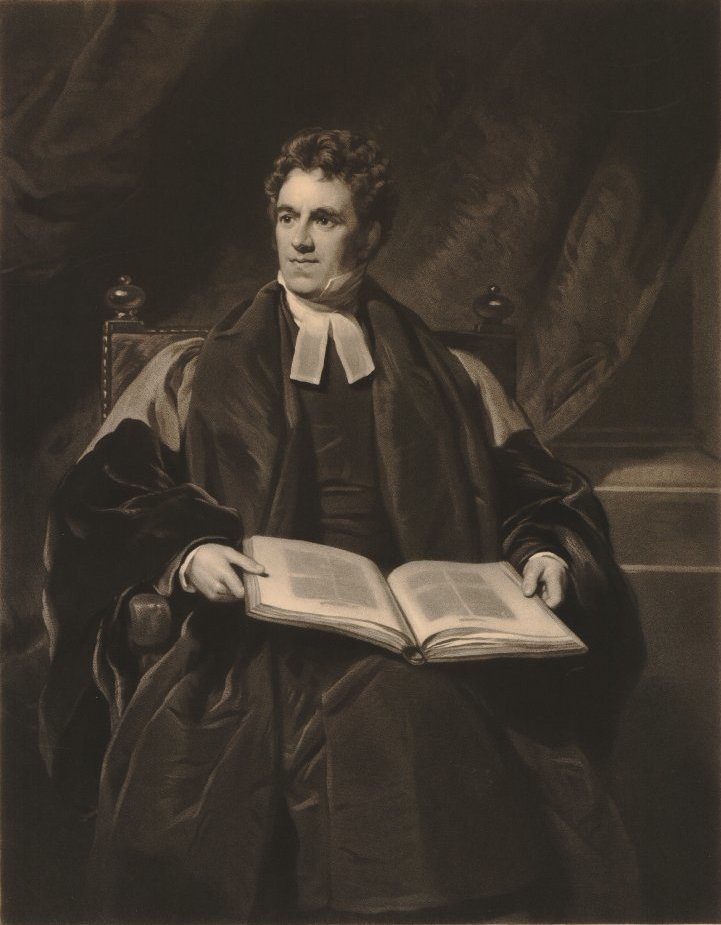
Thomas Arnold

- Thomas Arnold (Corpus Christi and Oriel) Headmaster Rugby School 1828–41
- Frank Aydelotte (Brasenose) President Swarthmore College 1921–40
- Trevor Bench-Capon (St John's) Professor of Computer Science, University of Liverpool
- Caroline Benn (formerly Viscountess Stansgate) co–founder Campaign for Comprehensive Educn, Pres Socialist Educn Assocn
- Michael T. Benson (St. Antony's) President of West Virginia University
- Sara Berkai, studied MSc Child Development and is a social enterprise founder and STEM educator
- Arthur Boissier Headmaster of Harrow 1939–42, Dir of Public Relations Ministry of Fuel & Power 1943–45
- Edward Henry Bradby (Balliol) Principal Hatfield College, Durham 1852, House Master Harrow 1853–68, Headmaster Haileybury 1868–83
- Joseph Lloyd Brereton (University) founder of schools and of Cavendish College, Cambridge
- Henry Bright (Brasenose and Balliol) Headmaster King's School, Worcester 1589–1627
- Henry Bright (Trinity and New College) Headmaster Abingdon 1758–74, New College School, Oxford 1774–94
- Scott Buchanan (Balliol) founder Great Books program St John's College, Annapolis
- Richard Busby (Christ Church) Headmaster of Westminster School 1638–95
- William Herbert Cam (New College) Headmaster Dudley Grammar School 1897–83, Abingdon 1883–93
- Jack Butterworth, Baron Butterworth (New College) founding Vice-Chancellor Warwick University
- Leo Chamberlain (University and St Benet's Hall) Headmaster Ampleforth 1992–2003, Master St Benet's 2004–
- Anthony Chenevix-Trench (Christ Church) Headmaster Bradfield 1955–64, Eton 1964–70, Fettes 1970
- William Macbride Childs (Keble) First vice-chancellor of the University of Reading
- Nathaniel L. Clapton (Hertford) Headmaster Boteler Grammar School, Warrington 1940–50, King Edward VII School, Sheffield 1950-65
- Cristóbal Coboresearcher in new and educational technologies

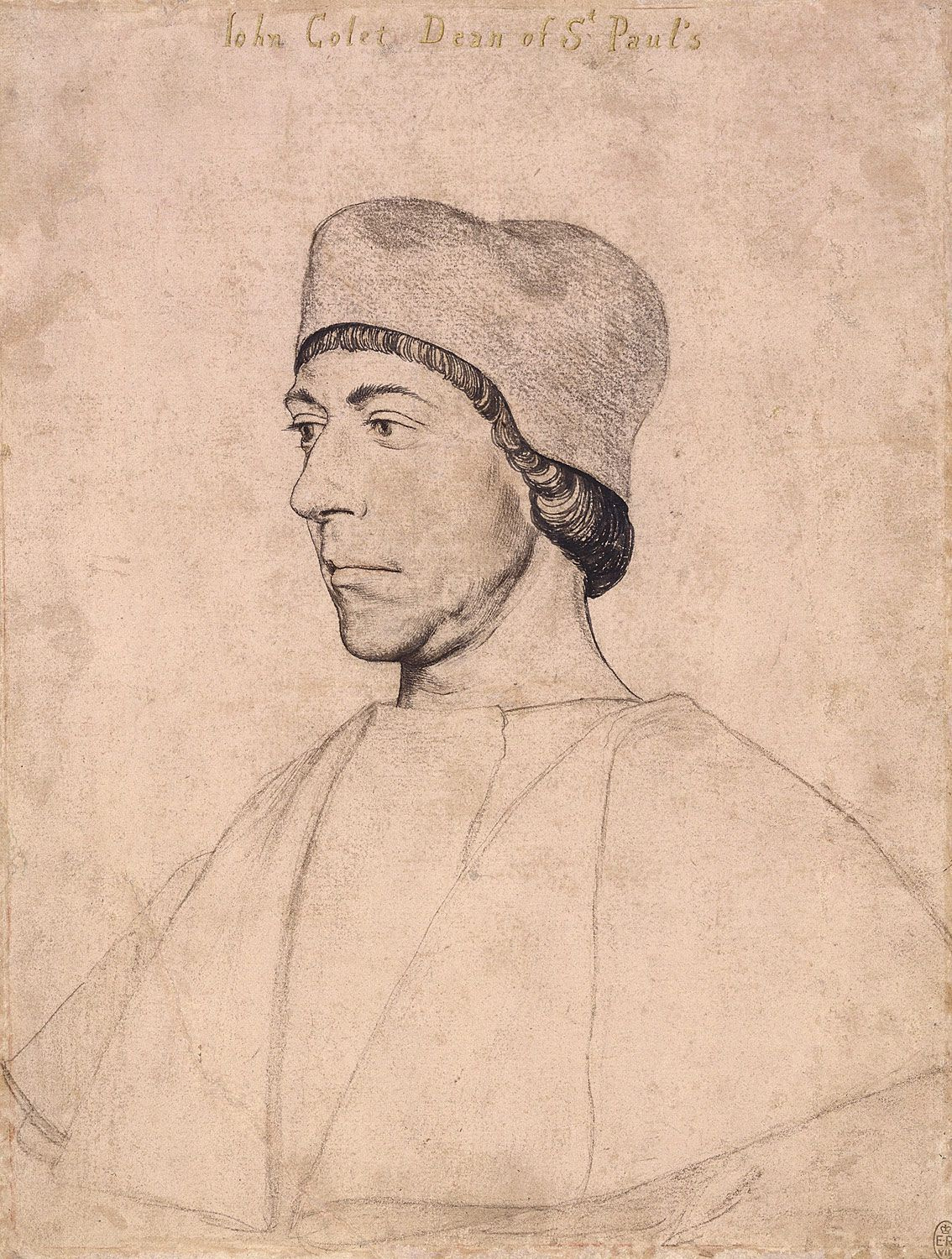
John Colet

- John Colet (Magdalen) Dean of St Paul's Cathedral, founder of St Paul's School, Chaplain to Henry VIII
- Terence Copley (Harris Manchester)
- Clive Dytor (Wycliffe Hall) Headmaster, Oratory School, Woodcote, Oxfordshire
- Owen Morgan Edwards (Balliol and Lincoln) Chief Inspector of Schools for Wales 1907, MP 1899–1900
- Thomas Farnaby (Merton) grammarian, former half of the 17th century
- Alan Gilbert (Nuffield) Vice-Chancellor University of Tasmania 1991–96, Melbourne 1996–2004, Manchester 2004-
- Erskine William Gladstone (Christ Church) Headmaster Lancing College 1961–69, Chief Scout UK and Overseas Territories 1972–82
- William Mitchell Grundy (Worcester) Headmaster Abingdon School 1913–47
- Paul Giles
- Ronald Gurner (St John's) Hdmaster Strand School 1920–26, King Edward VII, Sheffield 1926–27, Whitgift 1927–39
- William Ross Hardie (Balliol) Professor of Humanity, University of Edinburgh, 1895–1916
- Michael Hoban (University) Headmaster St Edmund's School, Canterbury 1960–64, Bradfield 1964–71, Harrow 1971–81
- John Hood (Worcester and All Souls) Vice-Chancellor University of Auckland 1999–2004, Oxford 2004–
- Christopher Jamison Headmaster Worth School 1993–2001, President, International Commission on Benedictine Education;
- Jonathan Kozol (Magdalen) expert on public education in the United States
- Alexander Leeper (St John's) Warden of Trinity College, University of Melbourne 1876–1918
- Sandy Lindsay (University and Balliol) Master of Balliol 1924–49, founder University College of North Staffordshire 1949
- Thayne McCulloh (Wolfson) President Gonzaga University, Spokane, Washington USA
- Stephen John McWatters (Trinity) Headmaster Clifton College 1963–75
- Harold Marks (University) HM Inspectorate of Education 1951–79
- Richard Mulcaster first Headmaster Merchant Taylors' School 1561–96, High Master St Paul's 1596
- H. J. R. Murray (Balliol) Hdmaster Ormskirk Grammar Sch 1896, school inspector 1901, Board of Education 1928, historian of chess
- Norah Lillian Penston (St Anne's) principal of Bedford College, University of London, from 1951–64
- Alec Peterson (Balliol) Director General of the International Baccalaureate Organisation 1968–77
- James Elphinstone Roe (Worcester) clergyman, convict, and educator in Western Australia
- Anthony Seldon (Worcester) Dep Hdmaster St Dunstan's Coll 1993–97, Hdmaster Brighton 1997–2005, Master Wellington 2005–
- Fred Shirley (St Edmund Hall) Headmaster Worksop College 1921–35, King's School, Canterbury 1935–62
- Leon Simon, President of the Hebrew University of Jerusalem
- Cecil Staton (Regent's Park College) Chancellor East Carolina University
- Alan Stewart founding vice-chancellor of Massey University, New Zealand
- William Alder Strange (Pembroke) Boden Sanskrit Scholar 1833, 2nd Master Lpool Royal Instn 1833–40, Hdmaster Abingdon 1840–68
- Michael Swan Founder of Swan School of English, freelance writer, famed grammarian
- Geoffrey Thomas (Kellogg and Linacre) Deputy Director Oxford University Department of External Studies 1978–86, Director Department for Continuing Education 1986–
- Winifred Todhunter founder Todhunter School, New York
- Ralph Townsend (Keble and Lincoln) Headmaster Sydney Grammar School 1989-99, Oundle School 1999-2005, Winchester College 2005-2016; Special Adviser to the President of Keio University and President Keio Academy of New York 2017-2021
- Jane Traies (St Anne's) educational consultant, former head teacher, lesbian-historical novelist
- Barry Trapnell (Worcester) Headmaster Denstone and Oundle Schools, Chairman Cambridge Occupational Analysts 1986–2005
- Tsuda Umeko (St Hilda's) founder of Joshi Eigaku–juku (now Tsudajuku University), Japan
- Richard Valpy (Pembroke) Headmaster Reading Grammar School 1781–1831
- Stacy Waddy (Balliol) Hdmaster King's Sch, Parramatta 1907–16, Canon St George's Cathl, Jerusalem 1918–24, Sec SPG 1924–37
- Olive Willis (Somerville) founder of Downe House School
- Nathaniel Woodard founder of eleven schools
- Aly Kassam-Remtulla academic, writer and anthropologist
