= Barry Trapnell =

English academic, school headmaster and amateur sportsman (1924–2012)

Barry Maurice Waller Trapnell, CBE, DL (18 May 1924 – 1 August 2012) was an English academic, school headmaster and amateur sportsman. As a cricket batsman, he was right-handed, and as a bowler, he was right-arm medium pace.

Born in Hampstead, London, Trapnell was educated at University College School, Hampstead, and St John's College, Cambridge. He had a short career in first-class cricket, lasting one season – 1946 – which was his last year as a student at Cambridge University. In nine matches for Cambridge University Cricket Club he took 15 wickets at 31.46 and scored 258 runs at 16.12, including 5 for 73 against MCC a week before the Varsity match. He turned out for the Gentlemen against the Players a fortnight later and made one Championship appearance for Middlesex County Cricket Club late in the season. He also played squash for Cambridge.

He became a chemistry don at Worcester College, Oxford, a researcher at Liverpool University, and consultant on catalysis at ICI. Later he became headmaster of Denstone College as, at that time, the youngest headmaster of a public school in England. At Denstone he instituted many reforms and, in educational terms, strongly promoted science education, encouraged more pupils to study a second modern language, and modernised religious education. He went on to become headmaster of Oundle School. In 1967 he was appointed a Deputy Lieutenant of Staffordshire.

He was President of Cambridge University Rugby Fives Club 1989–2004, having been National Singles Champion in 1949 and National Doubles Champion twice in 1949 and 1953.

In 1986, Trapnell became chairman of Cambridge Occupational Analysts (COA), eventually retiring in 2005. He put enormous effort into establishing the uptake of COA career programmes throughout the country and in organising training courses and visits to schools in the late eighties and nineties. His combination of scientific insight, wide-ranging interest in the arts, writing skills and personal contacts were of immense value.

Trapnell died on 1 August 2012.
