= St Lawrence Church, Winchester =

Coordinates: 51.0625°N 1.3149°W

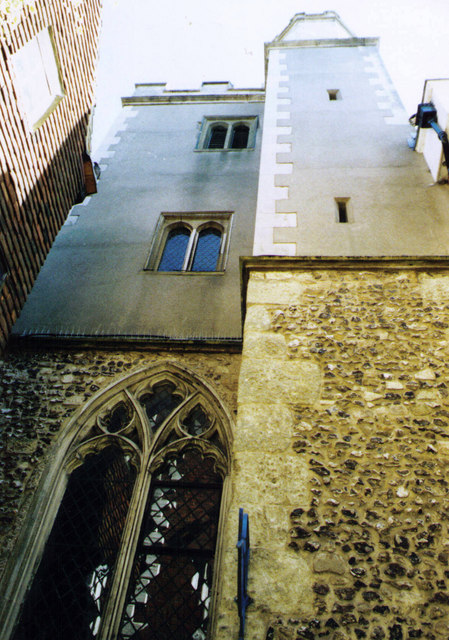
- St Lawrence Church, Winchester
- OS grid reference: SU 48105 29464
- Location: Winchester
- Country: England
- Denomination: Church of England
- Website: www.threesaints.org.uk/st-lawrence

Architecture
- Heritage designation: Grade II listed

Administration
- Province: Province of Canterbury
- Diocese: Diocese of Winchester
- Archdeaconry: Winchester
- Deanery: Winchester
- Benefice: Winchester Saint Bartholomew and Saint Lawrence with Saint Swithun-upon-Kingsgate
- Parish: Winchester Saint Lawrence with Saint Swithun-upon-Kingsgate

Clergy
- Rector: Rev'd Karen Kousseff

St Lawrence Church is a parish church in the Church of England in Winchester.

== History ==
The church is just off the High Street, in Winchester, England. It is probably of Norman origin, and is said to have been the chapel of William the Conqueror's palace (built 1069–70, destroyed 1141) with a tower added in the 15th century. The church is now almost wholly surrounded by adjacent buildings. It is recorded as being restored in 1475–7, in 1672 (the present roof dates from this restoration), 1847–8, 1881, and 1979–80.

St Lawrence Church is a Grade II listed building.

== Organ ==
The church contains a two manual pipe organ dating from 1882 by Jones and Son of Fulham which was almost completely replaced by George Osmond in 1966. A specification of the organ can be found on the National Pipe Organ Register.

== Rectors ==
The parish of St Lawrence was combined in 1904 with the parish of St Maurice (church demolished in 1957) and in 1973 with the parish of St Swithun-upon-Kingsgate whose church is now a chapel of ease in the parish of St Lawrence with St Swithun, which is in a united benefice with the parish of St Bartholomew, Hyde since 2010.

- 1305 John. Licensed by Bishop Woodstock
- ???? Richard Erdysleigh (resigned 1387)
- 1387 Robert Pauntone or Pannytone
- 1402 John Barbour of Milton Keynes
- ???? Thomas Kyrkby (resigned 1532)
- 1532 John Whitehart
- 1541 William Woodstock
- 1703 John Price
- 1733 Phillip Tennant
- 1738 Samuel Chadwick
- 1740 Robert Webber
- 1742 Reginald Cotton
- 1768 John Monk Newbolt
- 1779 George Isaac Huntingford
- 1788 Henry Dison Gabell
- 1818 John Williams
- 1831 Charles Pilkington
- 1837 Frederick Wickham
- 1840 Elborough Woodcock
- 1860 William Gindott Sealy
- 1868 Charles Wickham
- 1872 Henry Manning Richards
- 1895 William Maitland Clark
- 1904 Alfred Cecil Dicker
- 1906 Walter Edmund Colchester
- 1923 Charles Fanshawe
- 1925 Sidney Montague Watson
- 1947 Charles Oswald Rockett
- 1950 Bernard Cunningham Corfield
- 1963 Arthur James Moody
- 1973 Trevor Gifford Nash
- 1983 Michael John Benton
- 1991 David Victor Scott
- 2010 Clifford J Bannister
- 2021 Karen E Kousseff
