= Sharp sand =

Type of sand

Sharp sand, also known as grit sand or river sand and as builders' sand, concrete sand, or ASTM C33 when medium or coarse grain, is a gritty sand used in concrete and potting soil mixes or to loosen clay soil as well as for building projects. It is not cleaned or smoothed to the extent recreational play sand is. It is useful for drainage. It is an angular grained sand. It was used in the production of brass. It is now used in the building trade. Sand and gravel ridges known as eskers are a frequently used source.
