= Warminster School =

Public school in Wiltshire, England

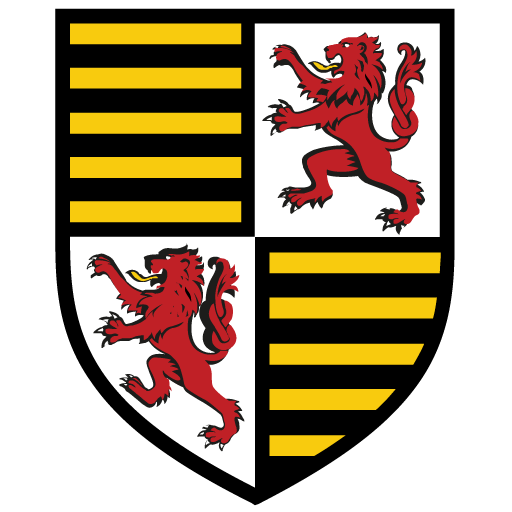

Location
- Warminster, Wiltshire, BA12 8PJ; England; 51.208°N 2.189°W

Information
- Former name: Lord Weymouth's Grammar School
- Type: Public School; Private day and boarding
- Religious affiliation: Church of England
- Established: 1707
- Founder: Thomas Thynne, 1st Viscount Weymouth
- Department for Education URN: 126522 Tables
- Ofsted: Reports
- Headmaster: Mark Sully
- Gender: Mixed
- Age: 3 to 18
- Enrollment: 433 (September 2026)
- Houses: Arnold, Denys, Finch, Ken
- Colour
- Former pupils: Old Verlucians
- Website: www.warminsterschool.org.uk

Warminster School is a co-educational private boarding and day school in Warminster, Wiltshire, England, for pupils aged three to eighteen. Initially established in 1707, the school took its current form in 1973 with the amalgamation of Lord Weymouth's Grammar School and St Monica's. It now comprises a preparatory school, for pupils aged three to eleven, and a senior school for students aged eleven to eighteen.

== Foundation and history ==
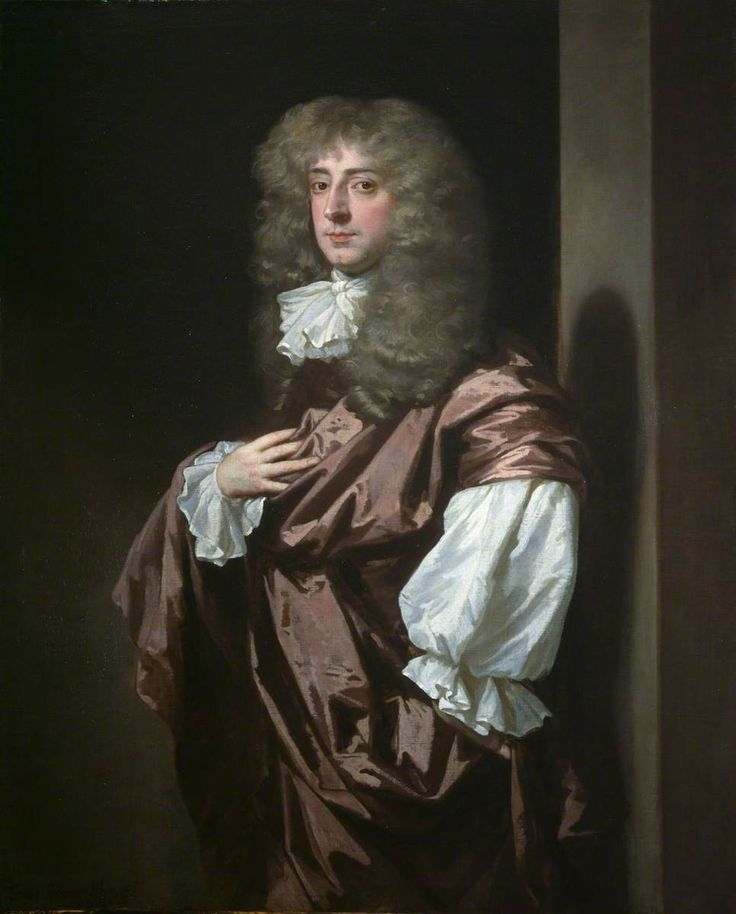
Thomas Thynne, 1st Viscount Weymouth

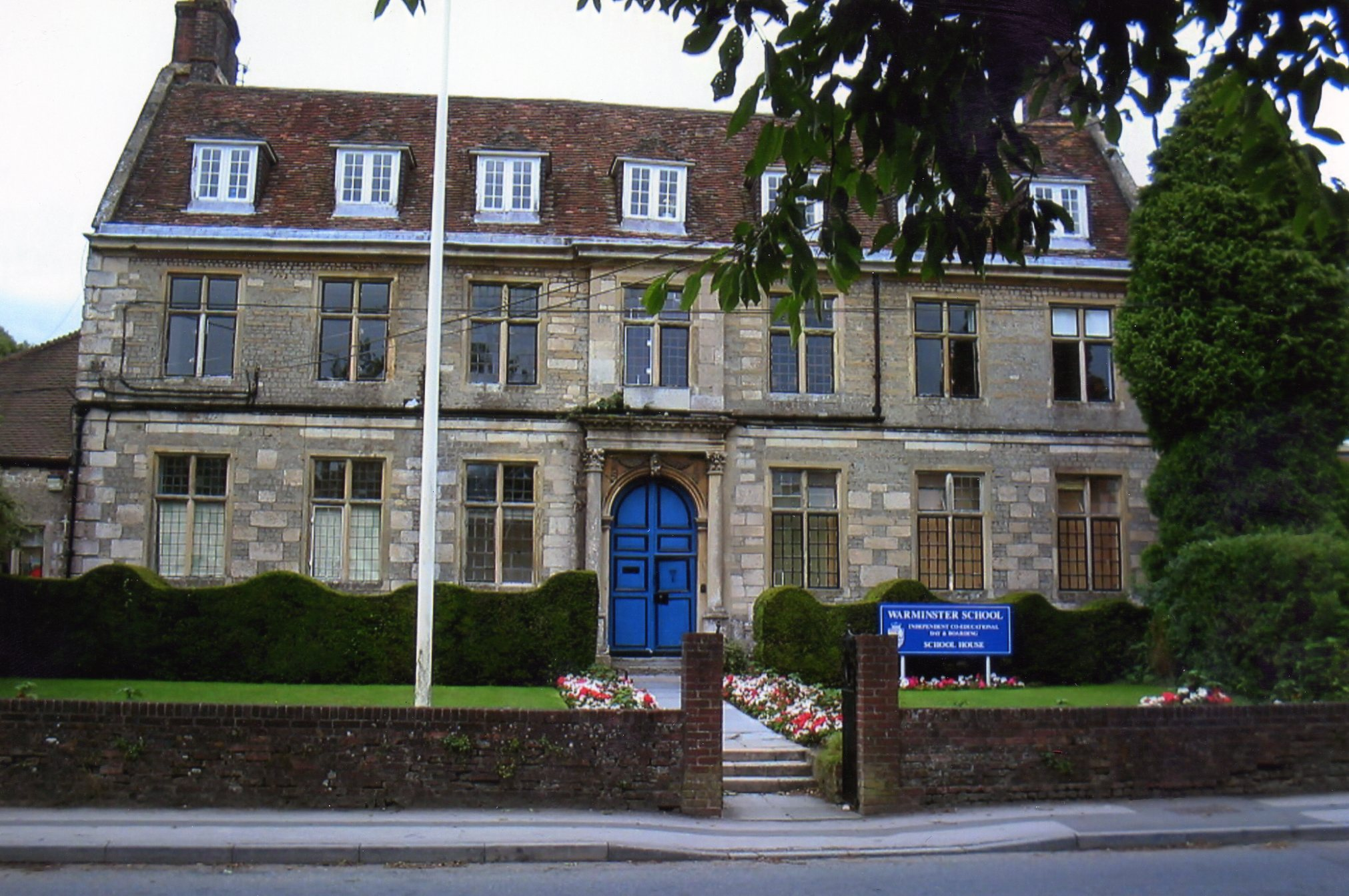
School House

In 1707, Thomas Thynne, 1st Viscount Weymouth, under the influence of Thomas Ken (1637–1711), founded a grammar school for boys in the market town of Warminster, near to his family seat of Longleat, to instruct the boys of Warminster, Longbridge Deverill, and Monkton Deverill in Latin, mathematics, and other subjects of the usual syllabus of the day. This became known as Lord Weymouth's Grammar School – referred to locally as the "Latin School" – and by the 20th century was called The Lord Weymouth School.

Lord Weymouth (1640–1714) was descended from the first John Thynne of Longleat House. In 1673 he married Lady Francis Finch, a daughter of Heneage Finch, 2nd Earl of Winchelsea, and lived at Drayton Basset, near Tamworth. He was Member of Parliament for the University of Oxford (1674–1679), and High Steward of Tamworth in 1679. In 1680 he was created Baron Thynne and in 1682 Viscount Weymouth. He was High Steward of the Royal Town of Sutton Coldfield from 1679 to 1714. His three sons all predeceased him.

For much of its history, Lord Weymouth's School was small. While Henry Dison Gabell was its schoolmaster, from 1790 to 1793, he had twenty boys to teach on the foundation, for which he was paid £30 a year, but had the right to supplement this by taking private pupils.

While the history of Lord Weymouth's School goes back to 1707, the school in its current form was created in 1973 by the merger of Lord Weymouth's, a boys' school, and the girls' school St Monica's, which had been founded in 1874 by the nuns of the St Denys Retreat. The present-day school also occupies some buildings once used by the former St Boniface Missionary College and the St Denys Convent and retreat.

== History of buildings ==
=== St Boniface ===
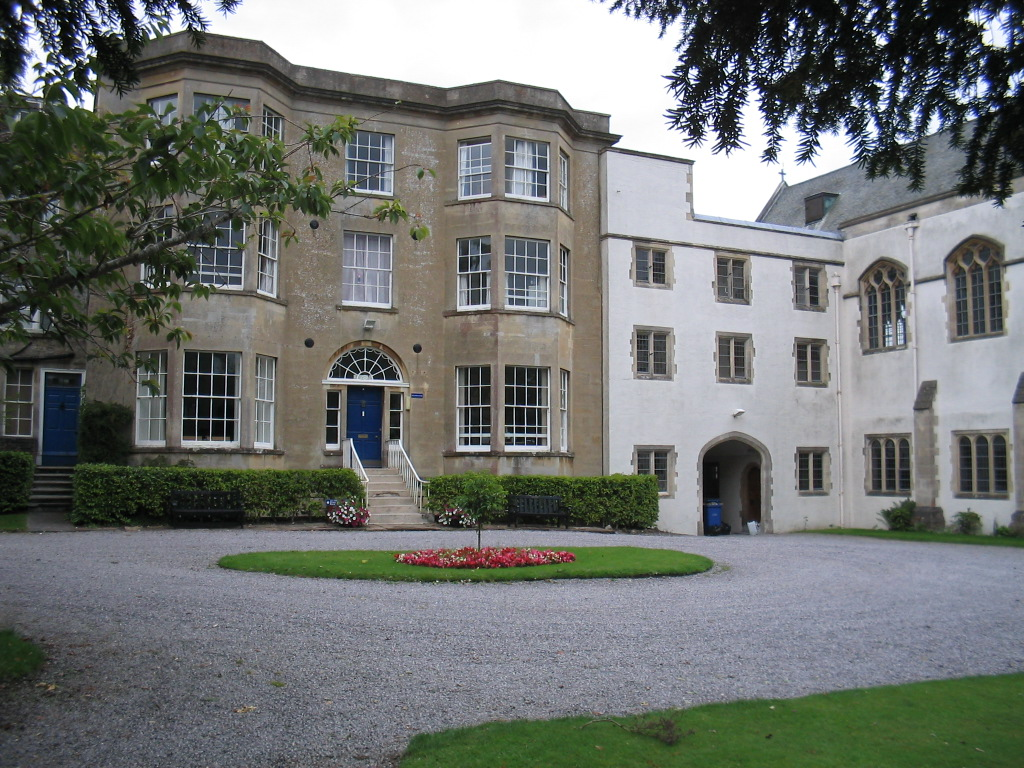
The Masters' Study, Boniface House

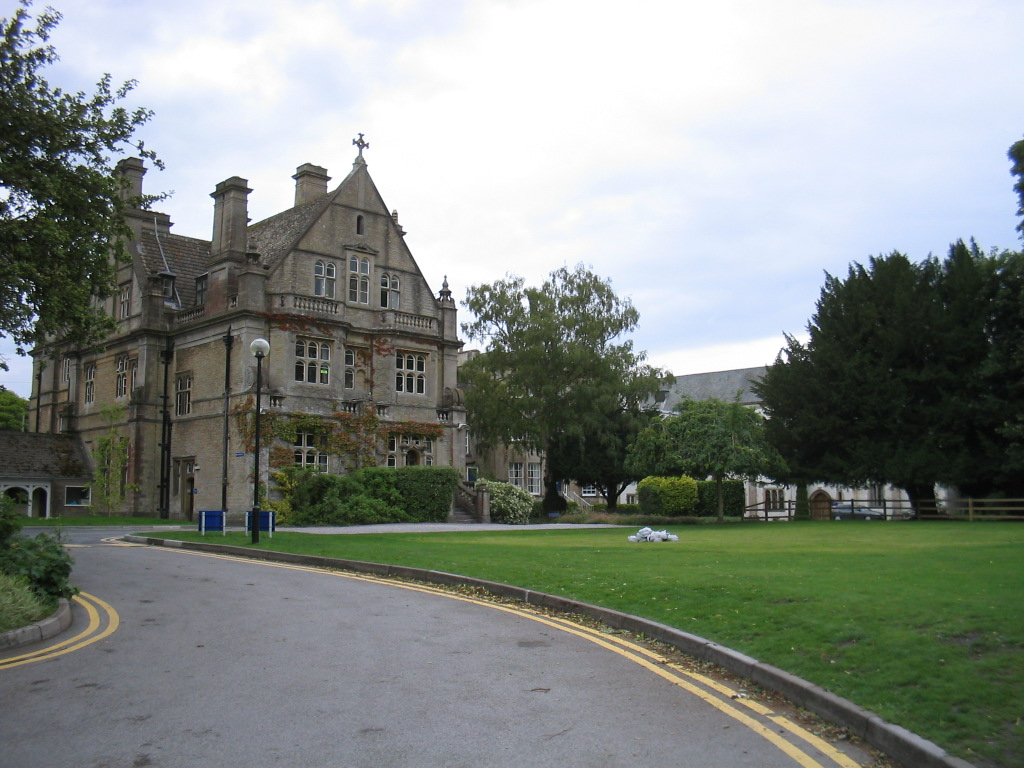
St. Boniface House

Now a major element of the School's estate, housing boarding accommodation and offices, St Boniface House started life as an Anglican missionary college founded by the energetic vicar of Warminster, the Rev. James Erasmus Philipps, whose family was interested in missionary work. The original intention was to train boys and young men who had little previous education but were capable of becoming good workers. Later on the aim was to train them for entry into missionary colleges, both at home and overseas. The Mission House was formally opened in a house near the parish church on 5 October 1860, with eleven students. By 1871 the range of education offered had grown considerably and as the result of a lead seal being dug up in a nearby garden bearing the name of Pope Boniface, the house's name was changed to St Boniface College. In the same year the students built a corrugated iron chapel, which later students enlarged in 1909, in use until 1936. In 1890 the students built themselves a cricket pavilion and established a printing press, on which they were publishing a college magazine in 1896.

In 1897 the foundation stone of new permanent buildings was laid on the north side of the house. The first block of these buildings was opened on 1 August 1899, and they were completed by 1901. They are built in the neo-Jacobean style of Doulting stone, with Bath stone dressings. Student numbers grew; in 1908 there were 40 and this later rose to 53. In 1913, after the death of Philipps, the constitution of the College was changed and one of the purposes now listed was for the actual training of missionaries. The College closed during the First World War but then re-opened and flourished. In 1927, a large extension to the south, designed by Sir Charles Nicholson, added a chapel and library. The College again closed for the duration of the Second World War.

When the college re-opened in 1948 it was associated with King's College, London, as a post-graduate training centre for missionary work. The numbers expanded to 57 students and a staff of three priests. In 1969 the course was moved from Warminster to Canterbury and the College closed. The St Boniface Trust was established and has leased the buildings and land to Warminster School ever since.

=== St Monica and St Denys ===
The Rev. J. E. Philipps also founded the Community of St. Denys; in addition to training women for work abroad, in 1890 the Anglican nuns of the community established St Monica's School for Girls, and until 1959 also ran the Orphanage of Pity. In September 1996, the St Denys building re-opened as a boarding house of Warminster School, for senior boys from Year 9 to the Upper Sixth. In September 2020, the school started a new diamond boarding system. St Denys was renamed St Monica's and is now the junior (Year 3 to Year 8) mixed boarding house.

== In media ==
In 2015, the school was featured in the ITV documentary School Swap: The Class Divide. The two-part documentary featured Jo Ward, (headteacher of the state-funded Bemrose School, Derby) and three pupils undertaking an exchange with pupils at Warminster School to explore the differences between state and private education.

== Notable Old Verlucians ==
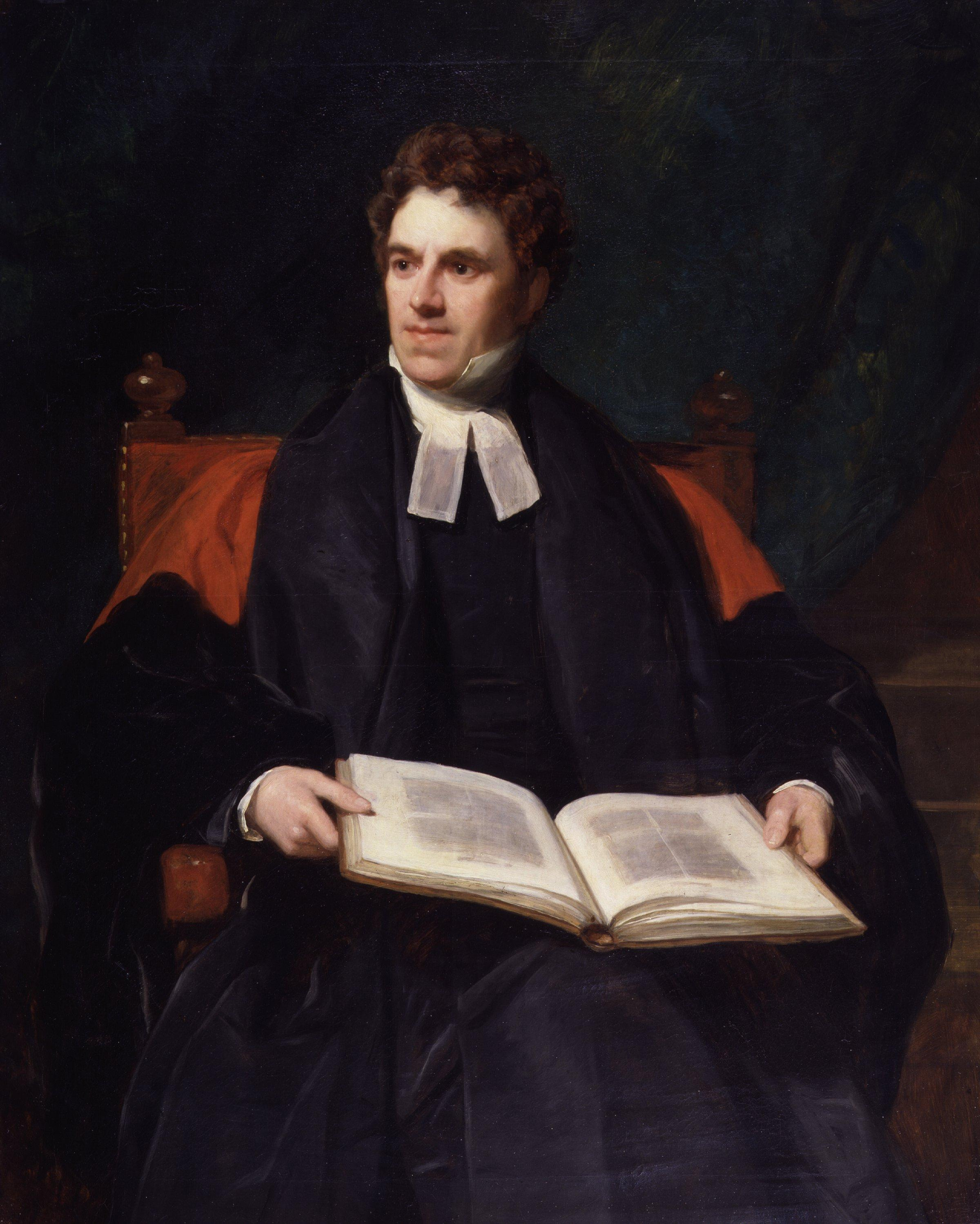
Portrait of Thomas Arnold by Thomas Phillips, 1839

Former pupils of Lord Weymouth's School, St. Monica's and Warminster School, are called Old Verlucians and include:

=== Lord Weymouth's School ===
- Thomas Arnold, educator, head master of Rugby School
- Sir David Barker, Captain-Superintendent of the Thames Nautical Training College, 1892–1919
- Guy Boothby, Australian writer and librettist
- Alexander Meyrick Broadley (1847–1916), barrister and author
- Bryan Dutton, soldier
- Ralph T. H. Griffith, Indologist
- James Ingram (1774–1850), Oxford don, Rawlinsonian Professor of Anglo-Saxon, and President of Trinity College, Oxford
- Frederick Jaeger (1928–2004), actor
- Samuel Squire (1714–1766), Bishop of St Davids
- A. B. Walkley, drama critic of The Times from 1900 to 1926
- Robert Walter, Conservative Member of Parliament from 1997 to 2015
- Wadham Penruddock Wyndham (1773–1843), member of parliament

=== Warminster School ===
- Christina Chan, Hong Kong political activist
- Sarah Dyke, Liberal Democrat Member of Parliament
- Sara Symington, cyclist and Olympian
- Tyrone Urch, British Army officer; Lieutenant General and Commander Home Command (2018)
- James Vince, Hampshire and England cricketer
- Jas Kayser, jazz musician and drummer for Lenny Kravitz

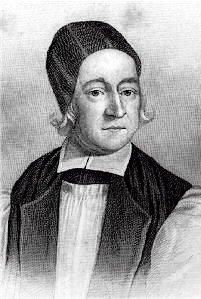
Thomas Ken, Bishop of Bath and Wells

== Warminster Fives ==
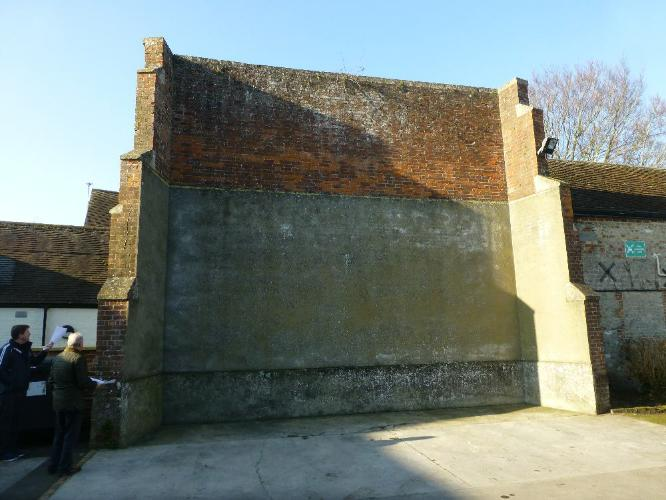
The fives court at Warminster

Behind School House stands a fives court, built in 1860. One source states that Lord Weymouth's school had a court before 1787. Fives has some similarities to squash: the court is similar in size but has a stone floor. No racket is required, only a pair of padded gloves. The rules for Warminster Fives are documented by the Eton Fives Association.

Warminster Fives is likely to be the same game as Wessex Fives, which originated some centuries ago, when men and boys sometimes used the buttresses and walls of a church and hit the ball with their hands against the walls – the angles of the buttresses and walls lending variety to the game. Several versions of fives were developed, the most common today being Eton Fives.

== List of headmasters ==
Lord Weymouth's School

- 1707 – Richard Barry
- 1742 – Thomas Martin
- 1771 – Philip Dart
- 1773 – Thomas Huntingford
- 1787 – George Isaac Huntingford
- 1790 – Henry Dison Gabell
- 1793 – John Griffith
- 1816 – Robert Clavey Griffith
- 1820 – Charles Tapp Griffith
- 1841 – Charles Maddock Arnold
- 1848 – William Alexander Whannell Hewitt Brunton
- 1857 – Thomas Edward Crallan
- 1864 – Charles Alcock
- 1895 – William Foulkes Blaxter
- 1920 – Charles Miller Stanley
- 1930 – John Henry Goldsmith
- 1940 – Ian Pendlebury Macdonald
- 1958 – Peter Lewis Deschamps Chamier
- 1959 – James Francis Clifford Brown
- 1971 – Ian Green

Warminster School

- 1973 – Ian Green
- 1979 – Gerald Vinestock
- 1984 – Malcolm Green
- 1990 – Tim Holgate
- 1996 – Michael Pipes
- 1998 – David Dowdles
- 2006 – Martin Priestley
- 2014 – Mark Mortimer
- 2019 – Matt Williams
- 2026 - Mark Sully
