= Eton fives =

Handball game similar to Rugby Fives

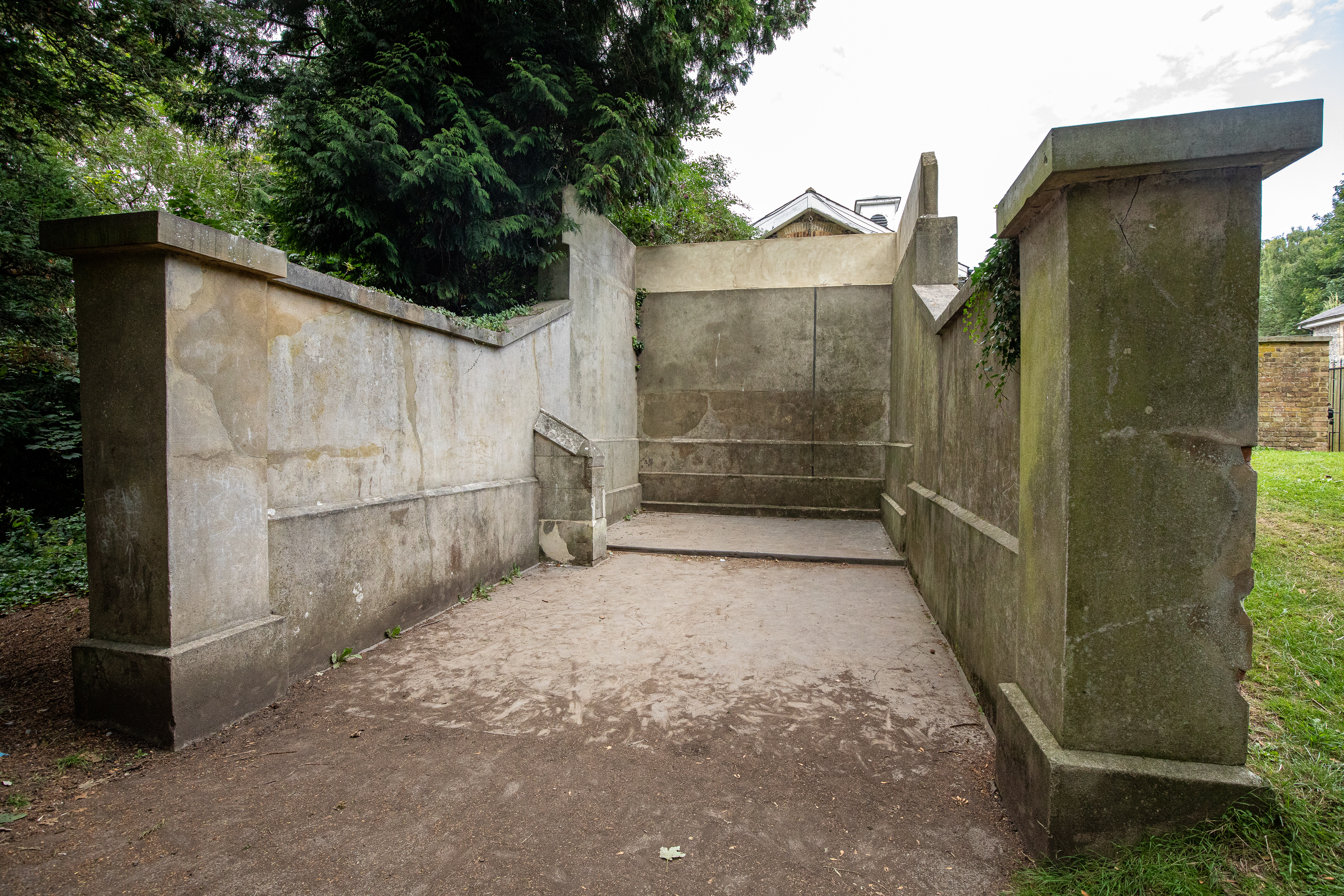
Outdoor Eton fives court at High Elms Country Park

Eton fives, a derivative of the British game of fives, is a handball game, similar to Rugby fives, played as doubles in a three-sided court. The object is to force the other team to fail to hit the ball 'up' off the front wall, using any variety of wall or ledge combinations as long as the ball is played 'up' before it bounces twice. Eton fives is an uncommon sport, with only a few courts, most of them as part of the facilities of the independent schools in the United Kingdom.

== Origins ==
Eton fives is a sport developed in the late 19th century at Eton College. The shape of the court used now is taken from the chapel at Eton College, where A. C. Ainger and some of his friends developed a simple set of rules in 1877. The rules have been modified since that time to those seen now, but the essential components are still the same.

Much earlier than the formalisation of Eton fives, a court was built in the grounds of Lord Weymouth's Grammar School, now Warminster School, in 1787, the School's 80th year. It is claimed that Thomas Arnold took the game with him to Rugby School leading to Rugby Fives. The court at Warminster School survives but is rarely used.

City of Norwich School (formerly Eaton (City of Norwich) School) is possibly unique in being a state-run comprehensive school which houses two fives courts. Matches have been undertaken on the courts between Eaton & Eton, but in the 1990s the courts were used as car parks for teaching staff. Since 2013 one of the courts has been used for fives, whilst the other is now a boiler room.

Dale Vargas, a retired teacher at Harrow School, where he was master in charge of Fives, has written and published a book about history of Eton fives, titled "Eton Fives: A History". The co-author is Peter Knowles.

== Court ==
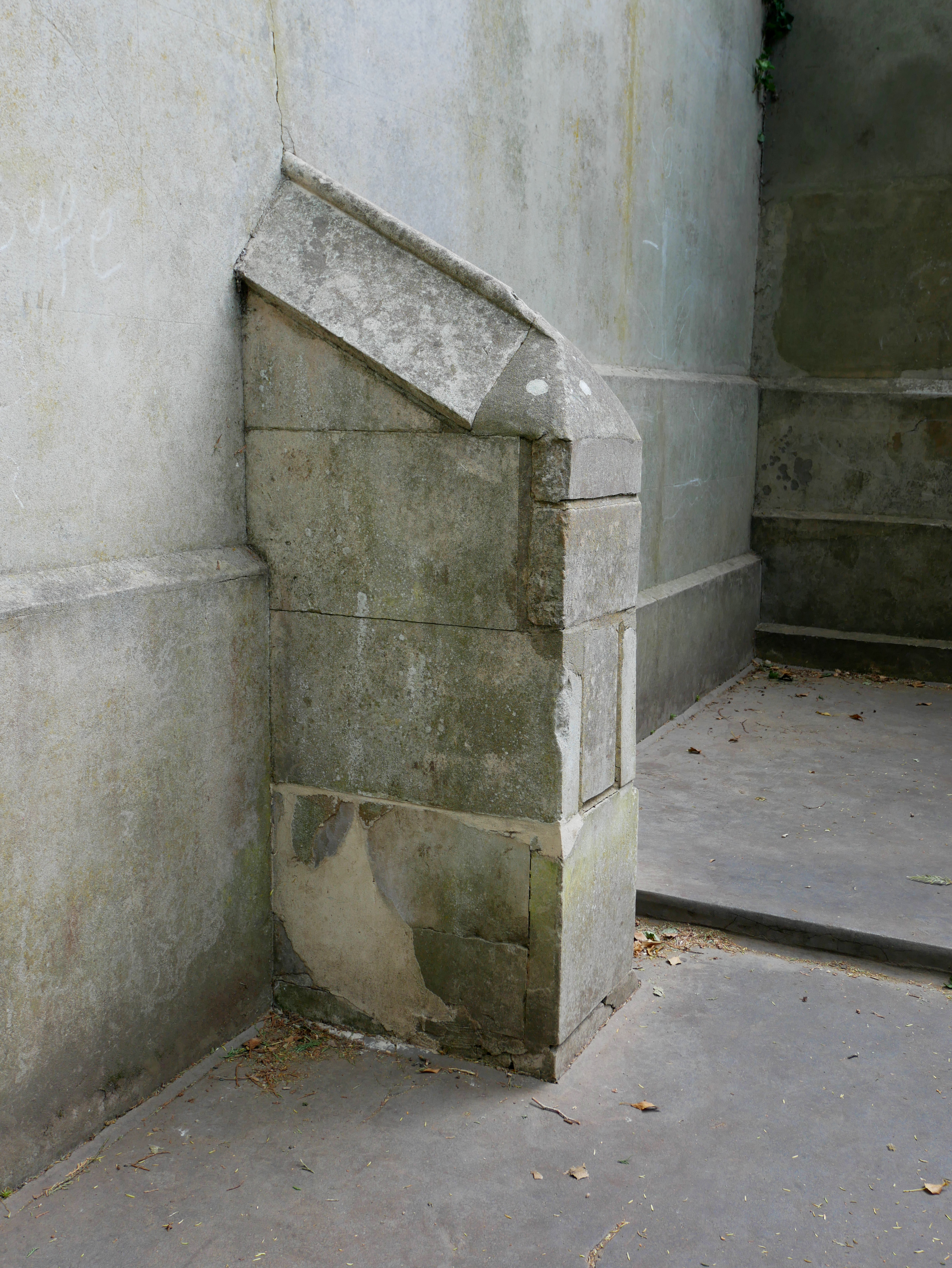
The buttress, step and ledges on the High Elms Country Park court, recreating an arbitrary architectural detail of the Eton College chapel

An Eton fives court consists of three walls, with the left-hand wall interrupted by a buttress approximately halfway up the court. There are also two levels to the court, the front being around six inches higher than the back half of the playing area. On the front wall is a vertical black line about three-quarters of a metre from the right wall; this is used during the serve and return process detailed later. There is a diagonal ledge that circumvents the entire 'top-step' at about chest height; it is this ledge which the ball has to hit or go above to be 'up'. Below this ledge, at knee height, is a horizontal ledge about two inches wide, and which is only present on the 'top-step'. This is merely here because of the origins of Eton fives as the ledge is present at the chapel in Eton College.

The diagonal ledge drops vertically at the edge of the 'top-step' and then returns to normal at a slightly lower height on the bottom step, running to the back of the court. At the back are brick columns that jut out slightly into the court, which vary in width from school to school, these "buttresses" are usually anywhere from 2 – 10 inches in width. Shots very rarely hit this part of the court, but once they do it is usually very effective for winning a point. Between the buttress and the top step is a small rectangular area about 10 cm sq, often referred to as the 'pepper pot'. If the ball is hit into the pepper pot it is almost always point-winning. Each of the courts at varying schools differ in some way, leaving room to modify how school's courts are built to a certain extent. In this way the 'home team' will often have an advantage over a visiting side because of their knowledge of the court's characteristics and layout.

== Rules ==
Fives has many rules that are similar to other court type games, such as tennis or squash:

1. The ball is only allowed to hit the floor once, although it can bounce off as many ledges or hit the walls any number of times.
2. The pair whose turn it is to hit the ball 'up' must do so without the ball hitting the ground.
3. The players can only use the gloves to return the ball, and no legs, arms, wrists, feet or any other appendages can be utilised in this way (similar to tennis and squash where the players can only use a racket).
4. The players can only hit the ball once before it must go up, and therefore only one member of the pair is able to hit the ball during the return of a shot (i.e., no volleyball style 'set-ups' can be used).
5. A pair can only score when it is their serve.

There are also a large number of rules unique to the game of Eton fives:

1. All games are played to 12, but if the score is 10–10 or 11–11 the game can be 'set' so that the players can play to a higher number.
2. The start of a point comes from a serve, and then a shot called a 'cut' is used to try and stop the server or his/her partner being able to hit the ball back.
3. The cut must go to the right of the black line on the front wall, but if the ball hits the right hand wall and then hits the front wall to the left of the black line this is regarded as 'in'. If the ball goes to the left of the black line a 'Black Guard' is in effect and if the serving pair hit the ball down they do not lose the point; it is treated as a 'let'.
4. When a pair reaches 11 points, the server must stand with at least one foot on the bottom step when they serve. From that point they cannot move until the 'cutter' has hit to ball. This is called 'step'.
5. On 'step' the cutter can hit the ball anywhere on the front wall, and does not have to go to the right of the black line.

== A point ==
At the start of the play, the server stands between the buttress and the front wall. The receiver, known as a 'cutter', stands in the backcourt, along with the other two players (the cutter's partner stands behind him, with the server's partner in the bottom right corner). The server throws the ball high so it bounces off the front and right wall, landing after the step and roughly in the middle of the court, although some players like to bounce a ball at different points in order to get varying types of spin on their 'cuts'. There are no rules about the serve but as a cutter can reject any serve, there is little benefit in a serve which can not be easily hit. The cutter will then often play the ball overarm so that it is 'up', usually into the corner, so that the ball hits the right then the front wall and goes straight back at the server. The best way to follow up this 'cut' is to follow the ball in and stand on the step, ready for a volley if the server returns it high. From here the cutter and the server will try to volley the ball, while the other two players will sweep up anything that they miss. This continues until the ball is either hit 'down' or out of the court.

== Competitions ==
There are several championships and tournaments that take place at various times throughout the fives season.

The Kinnaird Cup is an open tournament for any age. Over the years it has become more and more competitive and is now the most sought after trophy of them all. Other tournaments include the Northern Championships and the Eton fives Association (EFA) Trophy, where teams of 6 players (3 pairs) compete against one another in one-set matches.

The Schools National Championships are the highlight of the season for school players across the country. The location of the championships changes every year between Eton, Shrewsbury and Repton. There are championships for every age group, ranging from the Under 10s to the Open (Under 18s). Within these championships are the Main Tournament, Plate A and Plate B.

== Kinnaird winners ==
The following have won eight or more Kinnairds:

- 19 – Tom Dunbar (Harrovian): 2002–04, 06–07, 09, 11–23
- 13 – Seb Cooley (Olavian): 2011–23
- 11 – John Reynolds (Citizen): 1981–91
- 10 – Brian Matthews (Citizen): 1981–90
- 9 – Tony Hughes (Edwardian): 1958, 63, 65–68, 71, 73, 75
- 8 – Robin Mason (Edwardian): 1993–95, 98–99, 2002–04
- 8 – Gordon Campbell (Edwardian): 1958, 65–68, 71, 73, 75

== Keepers of Fives ==
The "Keeper of Fives" is the equivalent to the captain of any particular sport at any particular establishment the sport is played at. It is one of a number of minor officer positions to be held at Eton College.

== List of courts ==
Royal Grammar School, High Wycombe, St Bartholomews School, Newbury, St Olave's Grammar School, City of Norwich School and Queen Elizabeth's School, Barnet enjoy being the only non-private schools with access to an Eton Fives court in the UK.

Other schools with Fives courts include Alleyns School, Aldenham School, Shrewsbury School, Highgate School, Harrow, Berkhamsted School, Cranleigh School, Mill Hill School, Summer Fields, Sunningdale School, St Bees School, Eton College, King Edward's School, Birmingham, Westminster School, Wolverhampton Grammar School, Marlborough College, Oswestry School, Oakham School, Wrekin College, Repton School, Ipswich School, University College School, Stowe School (3 Courts) and Uppingham School, Dover College .

The University of Cambridge, St Olave's Grammar School, Bryanston School, Charterhouse School, Lancing College, Emanuel School and Summerfields Prep school house the only indoor Eton fives courts in England. At Cambridge, these three indoor courts, along with three Rugby fives courts, form the Jock Burnet Fives Centre, part of a Fives and Squash court complex.

The first real public courts were opened in the Westway Sports & Fitness Centre in London's White City, marking a possible change in fortunes for Eton fives as a minor sport.

Public school Rydal Penrhos currently has the only Eton fives courts in Wales.

Only a few courts exist outside Britain, most notably at Geelong Grammar School in Australia (the school is often referred to as the 'Eton of Australia'); there are also courts in Geneva, Zürich, Lyceum Alpinum Zuoz, Switzerland, St. Paul's School, Darjeeling, India (the school is often referred to as the 'Eton of the East') and Malay College Kuala Kangsar, Malaysia, while two courts are located in the village of Grillon, Provence in the south of France.

== See also ==
- Baseball5, another game involving hitting a ball with the hand
