= Rugby fives =

Handball game

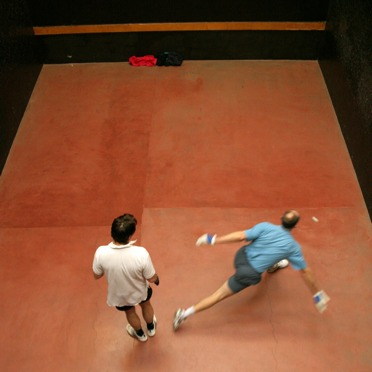
Phil Bishop playing singles against Dave Fox

Rugby fives is a handball game, similar to squash, played in an enclosed court. It has similarities with Winchester fives (a form of Wessex fives) and Eton fives. It is played mainly in the United Kingdom.

It is most commonly believed to be derived from Wessex fives, a game played by Thomas Arnold, famous Headmaster of Rugby School, who had played Wessex fives when a boy at Lord Weymouth's Grammar, now Warminster School. The open court of Wessex fives, built in 1787, is still in existence and use at Warminster School.

An early mention of the game can be found in the novel Tom Brown's School Days (1857) by Thomas Hughes. The author attended Rugby School during the period when Dr Arnold was Headmaster.

The game is played between two players (singles) or between two teams of two players each (doubles), the aim being to hit the ball above a 'bar' across the front wall in such a way that the opposition cannot return it before a second bounce. The ball is slightly larger than a golf ball, leather-coated and hard. Players wear leather padded gloves on both hands, with which they hit the ball.

== Rules of play ==
Either singles or doubles can be played.

=== Court ===
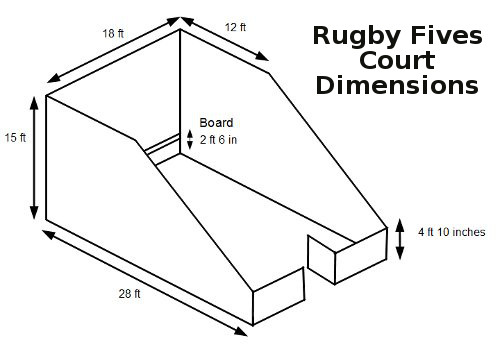
Rugby fives court dimensions

A standard Rugby fives court is four-walled, with the floor being rectangular in shape. It is 28 feet long by 18 feet wide and the upper limit of the in-court area is 15 feet for the front wall, sloping down the side walls to 4 feet 10 inches at the back wall. Previously, the height of the back wall was higher at 6 feet but was reduced for architectural reasons as it removes the need for a balcony in new facilities thus reducing building costs and improving communication between coaches and players. In addition, a wooden board running across the front wall with an upper height of 2 feet 6 inches marks the lower limit of the in-court area.

The ball is designed to bounce well on the concrete floor. The walls may be stone or brick but covered in a smooth layer of hard-wearing plaster or alternatively they may be of the same construction as modern squash courts being hollow engineered wood filled with sand.

Rugby fives courts tend to be somewhat idiosyncratic and the dimensions stated above are not always adhered to exactly, particularly those built before 1934 when standard dimensions were established.

A ball is available to allow Rugby fives to be played on a squash court. It is a little bouncier and zippier than the usual ball to account for the larger dimensions (4 feet longer and 3 feet wider), the cushioned wooden floor and lower board height, or rather 'tin' as it is termed.

=== Service ===
Usually a 50-50 chance scenario is adopted at the start of a match in order to determine who should serve first (e.g. one player puts the ball behind their back and their opponent guesses which hand it is in). A 'roll' is sometimes used to determine the team that serves 'seconds' or 'second hand'. A 'roll' requires the ball to be bounced off of the front wall and the team who rolls closest to the back wall serves 'seconds'. In order to initiate a point, the server must first throw the ball so that it hits the front wall above the bar, then clips the side wall. Once the ball has done this, the server can choose to retake his serve or continue by hitting it so that it hits the side wall followed by the front wall. If, on the hit part of the serve, the ball hits the front wall first then the serve is referred to as a 'blackguard' (pronounced 'blaggard'). The receiver has the option to take a blackguard, as long as they say 'yes' before striking the ball. If three consecutive blackguards are served without being taken then the server is deemed to have lost a rally.

In doubles, only the receiver initially designated to return serve may do so, unless the serve is a blackguard. In this instance, either receiver may choose to say 'yes' and return the ball.

As the ball may be hit with either hand, right-handed players will typically use their right hand and the front, right-hand corner of the court to serve. Left-handed players will serve with their left hand, using the front, left-hand corner of the court.

=== Play ===
Following the serve, the receiver and server take alternate turns to strike the ball against the front wall. The ball must be struck prior to it bouncing twice and while it may hit any combination of back and side walls on its way to the front wall, it must not hit the floor or an out-of-court area. Failing to validly hit the ball against the front wall loses the rally, which results in the following:

- In singles, the loser of a rally must serve the next point.
- In doubles, if the servers lose the rally then the designated server within that team changes. If the receivers lose the rally then:
  - if they have lost a previous point since they last served then they must serve the next point;
  - if they have not lost a previous point since they last served then the designated receiver within that team changes.

=== Scoring ===
Points are scored from receiving the serve in Rugby fives, as well as in Winchester fives. Thus, a point is only scored if the receiver wins the rally.

Games are played either to 11 or 15 (or 7 if players would like a quick and informal game), normally agreed before the game commences. If the score is tied at 1 less than the originally agreed winning total (i.e. 10-10 or 14-14) then the winning total is increased by 1 (12 and 16, respectively) but no further (unlike in tennis where the players have to win by 2 points in a tie-break).

The receiver's score is said first, so if the receiver has 10 points, and the server has 5, the score is 10-5. Zero is said as 'love'.

At the start of a game of doubles, the servers only need to win one rally in order to switch so that they are receiving (for the rest of the game the usual two before switching applies).

== Tournaments ==
Open

Tournament name	Age restrictions	Singles	Doubles
National Singles (Jesters Club Cup)*	None	Yes	No
National Doubles (Cyriax Cup)*	None	No	Yes
West of England	None	Yes	Yes
South-East Open	None	Yes	Yes
South-West Open	None	Yes	Yes
North of England Open	None	Yes	Yes
North-West Open	None	Yes	Yes
Scottish Open	None	Yes	Yes
London Open	None	Yes	Yes
Yorkshire Open	None	Yes	Yes
National Veterans	Over 45s	Yes	Yes
National Vintage	Over 55s	Yes	Yes
National Masters	Over 65s	No	Yes
National U25s	Under 25s	Yes	Yes
National Universities (BUSF) Championships	Student	Yes	Yes
National Schools' Championships	U13, U14, U16, U18	Yes	Yes
West of England Schools' Championships	U16, U18	Yes	Yes
Schools' Winchester Fives Doubles	U18	No	Yes
RFA President's Cup	None	No	Yes
Winchester Fives Open Doubles	None	No	Yes

Women

Tournament name	Age restrictions	Singles	Doubles
National Ladies Singles and Doubles	None	Yes	Yes
National Ladies U25 Singles and Doubles	Under 25s	Yes	Yes
National Ladies Winchester Fives	None	Yes	Yes
National Schools' Girls Championships	U13, U14, U16, U18	Yes	Yes

Other

Tournament name	Age restrictions	Singles	Doubles
National Mixed Doubles	None	No	Yes
Owers Trophy (Old Boys' Tournament)	None	Yes	Yes
National Club Championship (Wood Cup)	None	Yes	Yes

The asterisk indicates that these tournaments may have qualification rounds to play in the main knockout. The top 4 players in the singles rankings automatically qualify for singles tournaments, and the similarly the top 4 doubles pairs qualify automatically.

== The Rugby Fives Association (RFA) ==
The RFA is the governing body for the sport of Rugby Fives. The association aims to promote the playing and coaching of Fives at schools, universities and senior level, and throughout the community in general. It does this by organising matches and tournaments throughout the season and advising on – and wherever possible supporting financially – the regeneration of facilities and provision of suitable coaching and equipment to further the game's development across the country. The website of the RFA is www.therfa.uk.

== National singles and doubles champions ==
The current national singles champion is Ben Beltrami (November 2025) and national doubles champions are Ed Kay and Dan Tristao (April 2026).

== History ==
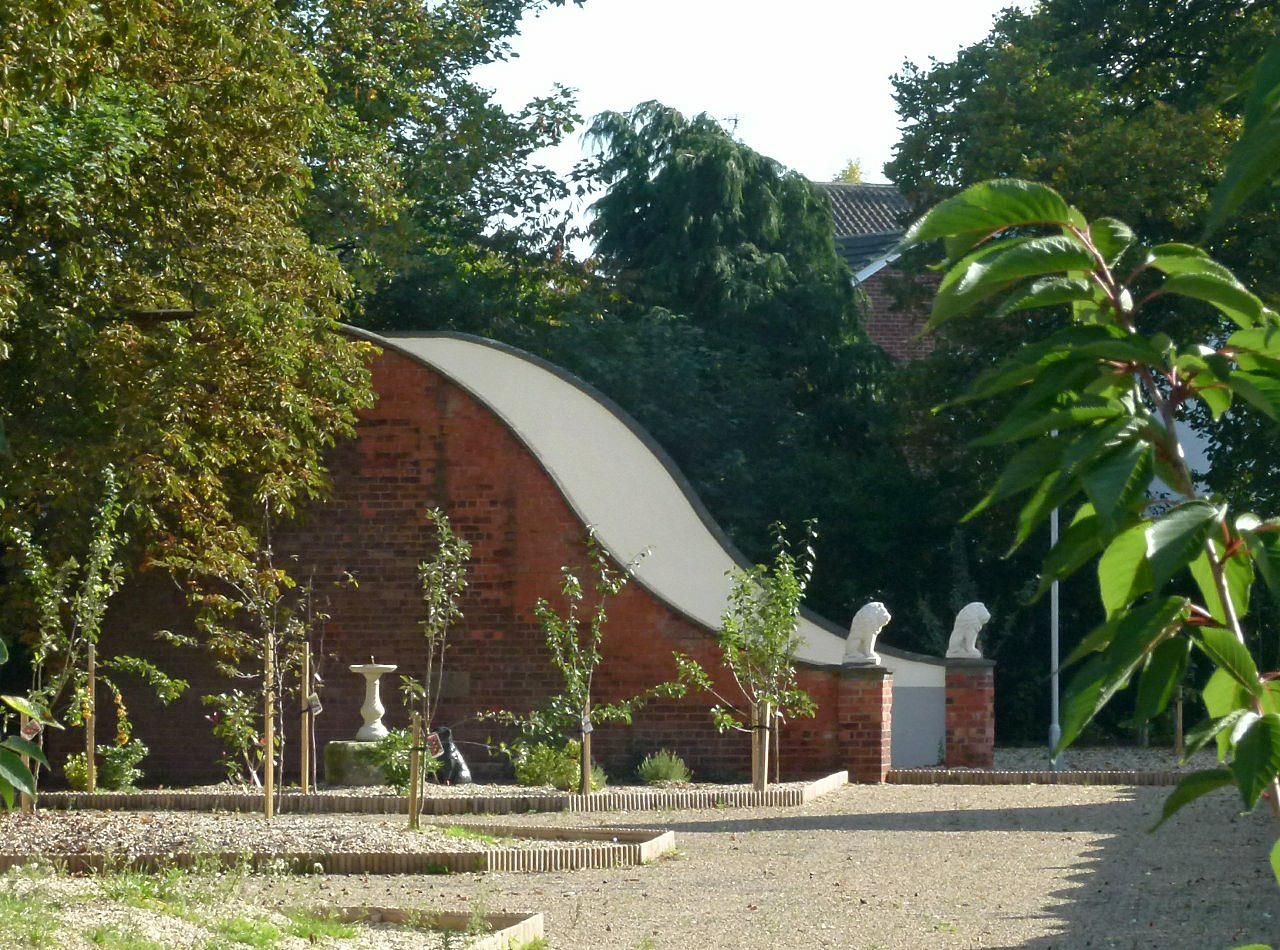
Rugby fives court, Retford, Nottinghamshire

Rugby Fives Court in Retford, Nottinghamshire was built in memory of Captain William Eyre of the Lancashire Fusiliers who died at Gallipoli, and was a former pupil and teacher at the school. Only about 20 courts (including this one) are listed. The court was recently refurbished as part of the redevelopment of the site and is classified as a War Memorial.

== See also ==
- Baseball5, another game involving hitting a ball with the hand
