= Allies of World War II =

Military coalition in World War II

- 1939–1945
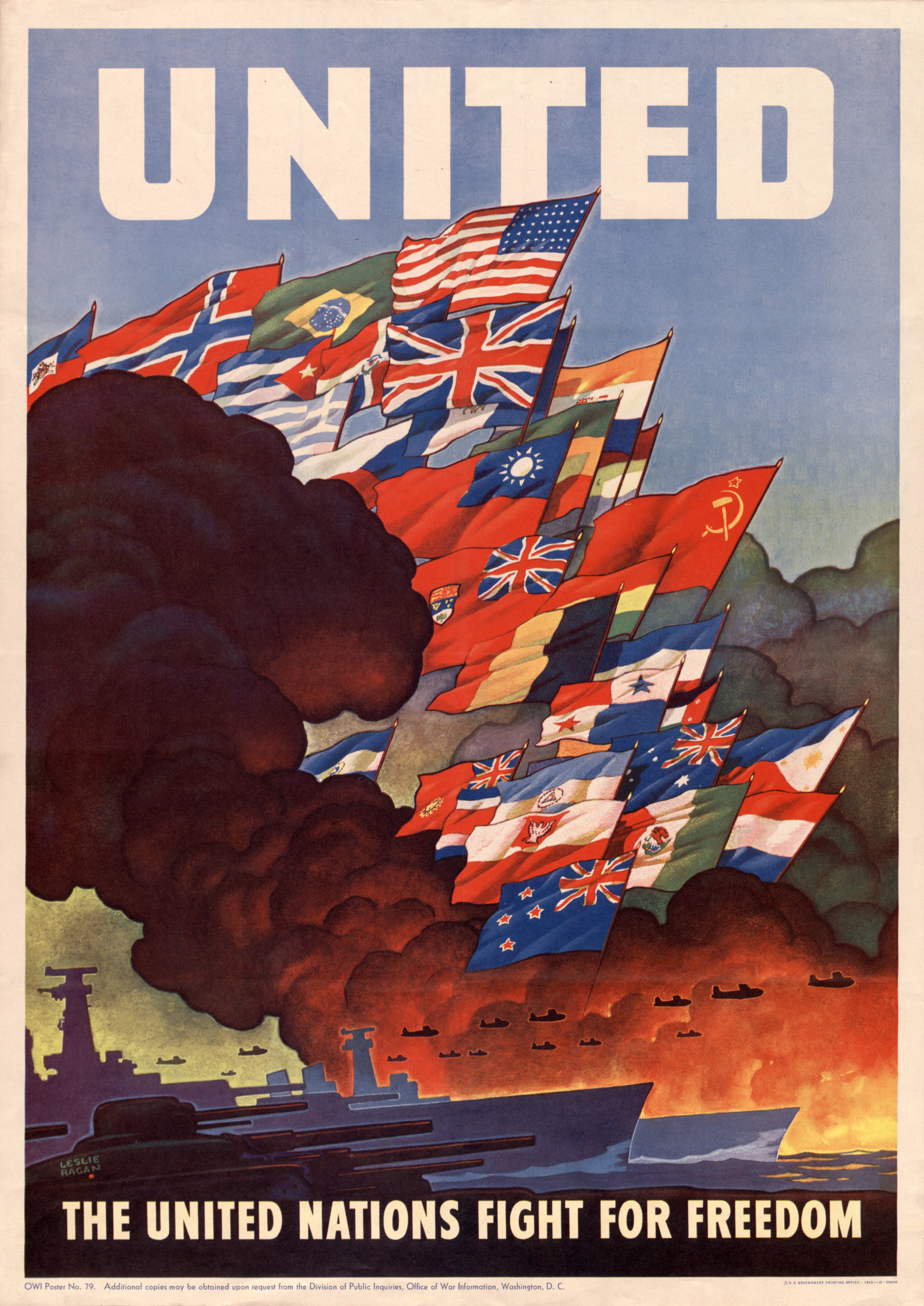
- A 1943 propaganda poster showing the flags of many of the members of the Allies, including the "Big Four" The Big Three: United Kingdom (from September 1939); Soviet Union (from June 1941); United States (from December 1941); Full list
- Status: Military alliance
- Historical era: World War II
  - Franco-Polish alliance: 21 February 1921
  - Anglo-Polish alliance: August 1939
  - Anglo-French War Council: September 1939 – June 1940
  - First Inter-Allied Meeting: June 1941
  - Anglo-Soviet alliance: July 1941
  - Atlantic Charter: August 1941
  - Declaration by United Nations: January 1942
  - Anglo-Soviet Treaty: May 1942
  - Tehran Conference: November–December 1943
  - Bretton Woods Conference: 1–15 July 1944
  - Yalta Conference: 4–11 February 1945
  - United Nations formed: April–June 1945
  - Potsdam Conference: July–August 1945
Preceded by	Succeeded by
League of Nations	United Nations

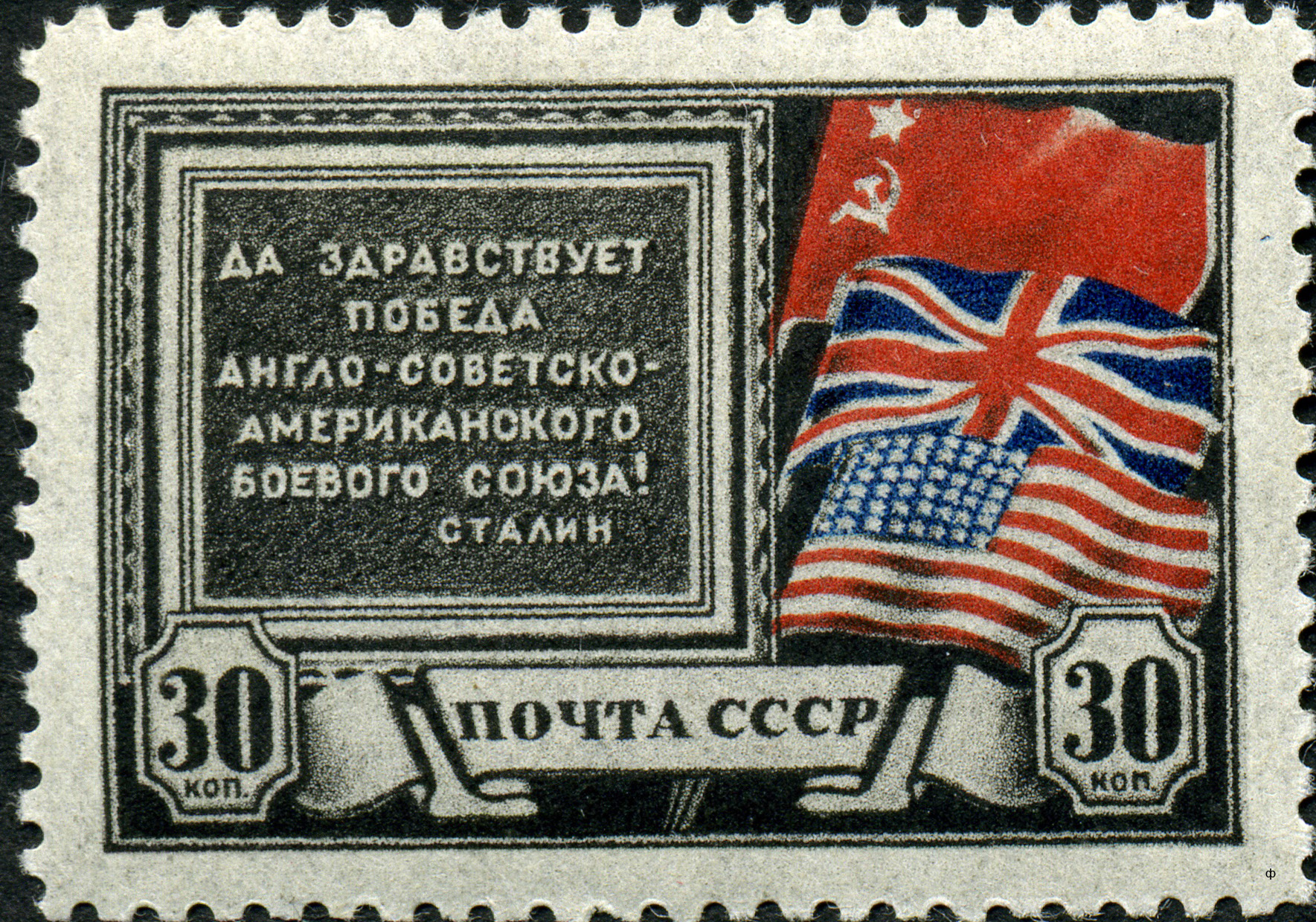
"Long live the victory of the Anglo-Soviet-American military alliance!" – USSR stamp of 1943, quoting Stalin

The Allies, or Allied powers, formally referred to as the United Nations from 1942, were an international military coalition formed during World War II (1939–1945) to oppose the Axis powers. Its principal members were the "Big Four"—the United Kingdom, the Soviet Union, the United States, and China.

Membership in the Allies varied during the course of the war. When the conflict broke out on 1 September 1939, the Allied coalition consisted of the United Kingdom, France, and Poland, as well as their respective dependencies, such as British India. They were joined by the independent dominions of the British Commonwealth: Canada, Australia, New Zealand and South Africa. Consequently, the initial alliance resembled that of the First World War. As Axis forces began invading northern Europe and the Balkans, the Allies added the Netherlands, Belgium, Norway, Greece, and Yugoslavia. The Soviet Union, which initially had a non-aggression pact with Germany (which resulted in the Soviet invasion of Poland) joined the Allies after the German invasion of the Soviet Union in June 1941. The United States, while providing some material support to European Allies since September 1940, remained formally neutral until the Japanese attack on Pearl Harbor in December 1941, after which it declared war and officially joined the Allies. The Republic of China had already been at war with Japan since 1937 after the Marco Polo Bridge incident, and formally joined the Allies in December 1941.

The "Big Three"—the United Kingdom, the Soviet Union, and the United States—were the principal contributors of manpower, resources and strategy, each playing a key role in achieving victory. Relations between the United Kingdom and the United States were especially close, with their bilateral Atlantic Charter forming the basis of their alliance. A series of conferences between Allied leaders, diplomats, and military officials gradually shaped the makeup of the alliance, the direction of the war, and ultimately the postwar international order.

The Allies became a formalized group upon the Declaration by United Nations on 1 January 1942, which was signed by 26 countries around the world; these ranged from governments in exile from the Axis occupation to small states far removed from the war. The Declaration officially recognized the Big Three and China as the "Four Powers", acknowledging their central role in prosecuting the war; they were also referred to as the "trusteeship of the powerful", and later as the "Four Policemen" of the United Nations. Many more countries joined through to the final days of the war, including colonies and former Axis states. After the war ended, the Allies, and the Declaration that bound them, would become the basis of the modern United Nations.

== Origins ==
Following the First World War, the Treaty of Versailles (1919) established the League of Nations in an attempt to create a system of collective security and prevent war. The League's covenant obliged members to protect the political and territorial integrity of all members against aggression. Four of the major allies of the First World War—the United Kingdom, France, Italy and Japan—became permanent members of the league's council. The league, however, was weakened by the failure of the United States to join and by the cumbersome rules for enforcing sanctions for breaches of its security provisions.

France attempted to further protect itself against possible future German attack with the Franco-Polish alliance (1921) and the Franco-Czechoslovak alliance (1924). Under the Locarno treaties (1925), France, Britain, Belgium, Germany and Italy also guaranteed the borders between Germany and France and Germany and Belgium as defined in the Treaty of Versailles.

The system of collective security was weakened when Japan withdrew from the League in February 1933, following the League's criticism of Japan's invasion of Manchuria in 1931. A further blow came when Nazi Germany withdrew from the League and the world disarmament conference in October 1933. In May 1935, France signed a mutual defence agreement with the Soviet Union, which Germany saw as directed against it. In October 1935, Italy invaded Abyssinia and the league responded with weak, short-lived sanctions.

Germany remilitarised the Rhineland in March 1936 in contravention of the Versailles and Locarno treaties but Britain, France and the League of Nations imposed no sanctions. Britain, however, announced that it would aid France and Belgium if they were the victims of aggression, and France stated that it would assist Britain and Belgium in the same circumstances. In July 1937, Japan began an undeclared war in China. The league found Japan's actions illegal and invited its members to impose sanctions. In November, Italy joined the German and Japanese Anti-Comintern pact, and in December it left the league.

In March 1938, Germany invaded and annexed Austria in contravention of the Versailles treaty. France and Britain issued formal protests but took no further action. Britain declined a Soviet offer to form a defensive alliance against Germany and also declined a French request to provide a security guarantee to Czechoslovakia, which was subject to German threats over its alleged mistreatment of the German-speaking majority in its Sudetenland region. Instead, Britain continued its policy of appeasing Germany by putting pressure on Czechoslovakia to negotiate a solution acceptable to Hitler. As the crisis deepened, Britain, France, Germany, and Italy signed the Munich Agreement on 30 September 1938, whereby the Sudetenland was ceded to Germany against the wishes of the Czechoslovak government, and the signatories guaranteed the territorial integrity of the rump Czechoslovak state.

Germany invaded Czechoslovakia on 15 March 1939 in violation of the Munich Agreement. Subsequently, Germany increased pressure on Poland to agree to the transfer of Danzig (a free city under the Versailles treaty) and the Polish corridor to Germany. On 31 March, Britain and France announced that they would come to Poland's aid if it were attacked. Italy invaded Albania on 7 April, and Britain and France responded by issuing security guarantees to Greece, Romania and Turkey. In May, France and Poland agreed to preliminary political and military protocols for mutual defence. Britain and France also began negotiations for a defence treaty with the Soviet Union but little progress was made. On 22 May, Germany and Italy signed a military alliance known as the Pact of Steel.

The governments of Germany and the Soviet Union signed a non-aggression pact on 23 August, which included a secret protocol for the partition of Poland. Two days later, Britain signed a military alliance with Poland.

== Grand Alliance ==
=== Formation ===
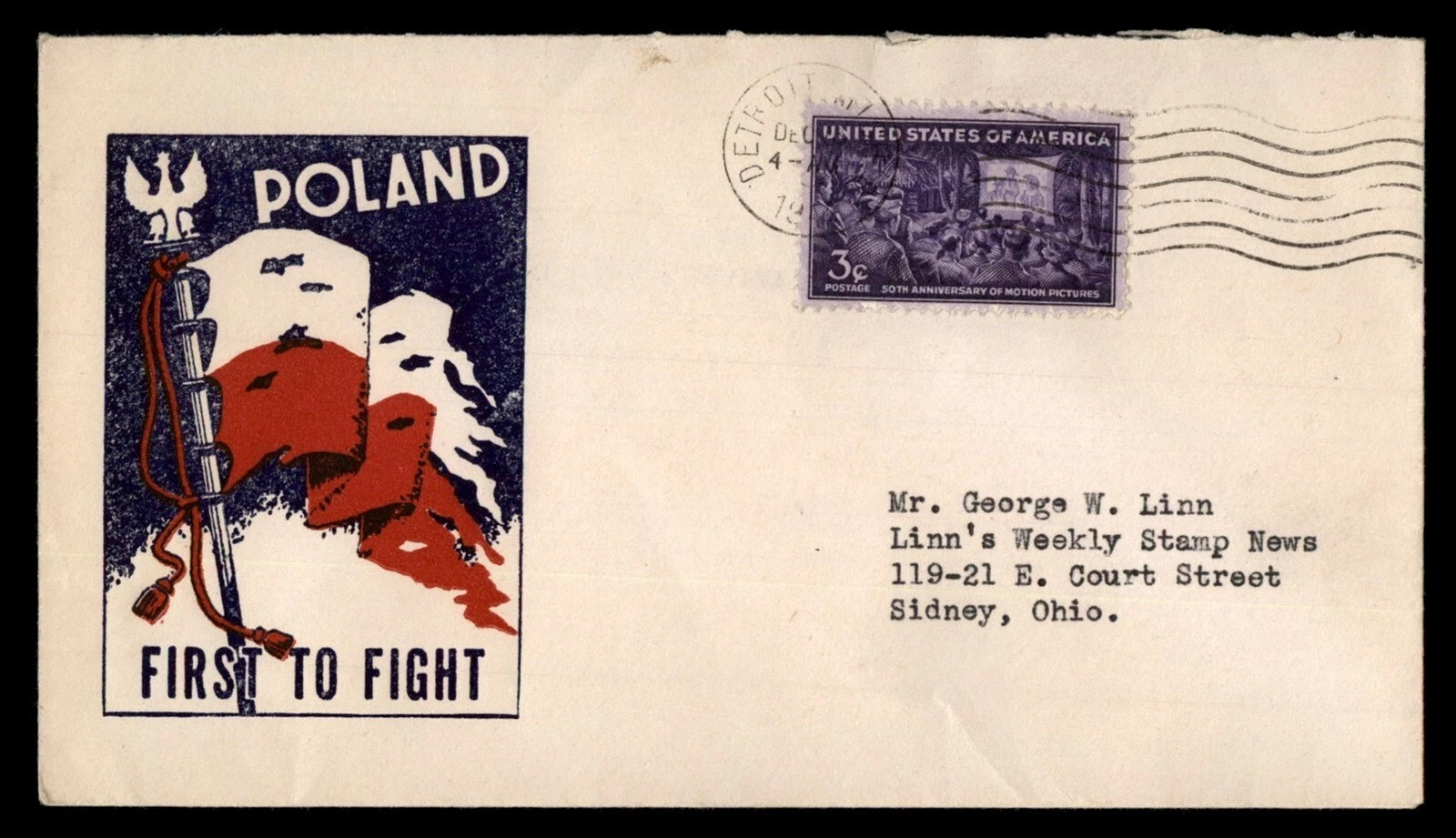
A 1940, Poland - First to Fight, US envelope design printed in support of Poland following the German invasion of the country

On 1 September 1939, Germany invaded Poland, and on 3 September, Britain and France declared war on Germany. The Soviet Union invaded Poland from the east on 17 September but remained officially neutral in the war between Germany and the western allies. Italy, Japan and the United States were also formally neutral in the conflict, although Italy eventually declared war on Britain and France on 10 June 1940.

Australia, New Zealand, South Africa and Canada declared war on Germany in the two weeks following the British declaration. An Anglo-French Supreme War Council was established to coordinate military decisions and it first met on 12 September 1939. By 1 October, Warsaw had fallen and the Polish government had escaped into exile. Following a lull in fighting between Germany and the western allies, Germany began its invasion of western Europe in April 1940, quickly overrunning Denmark, Norway, the Low Countries, and France. The governments of these occupied countries, except France, fled, establishing governments-in-exile in London which Britain recognized as allies. Britain recognized Charles de Gaulle as leader of the Free-French forces in London, which opposed the collaborationist French Vichy government. The Free French, however, were not recognized as a government-in-exile until 1944. Czechoslovakia, Yugoslavia and Greece also established governments-in-exile in 1941 following the German advances towards eastern Mediterranean.

The First Inter-Allied Meeting took place in London in early June 1941 between the United Kingdom, the four allied British Dominions, the eight governments in exile, and Free France. The meeting culminated with the Declaration of St James's Palace, which committed the signatories to work together until victory was achieved and an enduring peace secured.

On 22 June 1941, Hitler broke the non-aggression agreement with Stalin and Axis forces invaded the Soviet Union. Britain formed an alliance with the Soviet Union in July, whereby they agreed to assist one another by any means, and to never negotiate a separate peace. (Note: "On the political front, the Soviet Union and Great Britain had signed an agreement in Moscow on July 12, 1941. Requested by Stalin as a sign of cooperation, it provided for mutual assistance and an understanding not to negotiate or conclude an armistice or peace except by mutual consent. Soviet insistence on such an agreement presumably reflected their suspicion of Great Britain, though there is no evidence that either party to it ever ceased to have its doubt about the loyalty of the other if attractive alternatives were thought to be available." See Weinberg (2005) pp. 284-285.) The following August saw the Atlantic Conference between American President Franklin Roosevelt and British Prime Minister Winston Churchill, which defined a common Anglo-American vision of the post-war world, as formalized by the Atlantic Charter.

At the Second Inter-Allied Meeting in London in September 1941, the Soviet Union joined the other Allies in adopting the Atlantic Charter. On 7–8 December, Japan attacked American and British territories in Asia and the Pacific, resulting in the US entering the war as an Allied power. China, which had been resisting a Japanese invasion since 1937, formally declared war on the Axis on 9 December.

=== The Big Three and Big Four ===
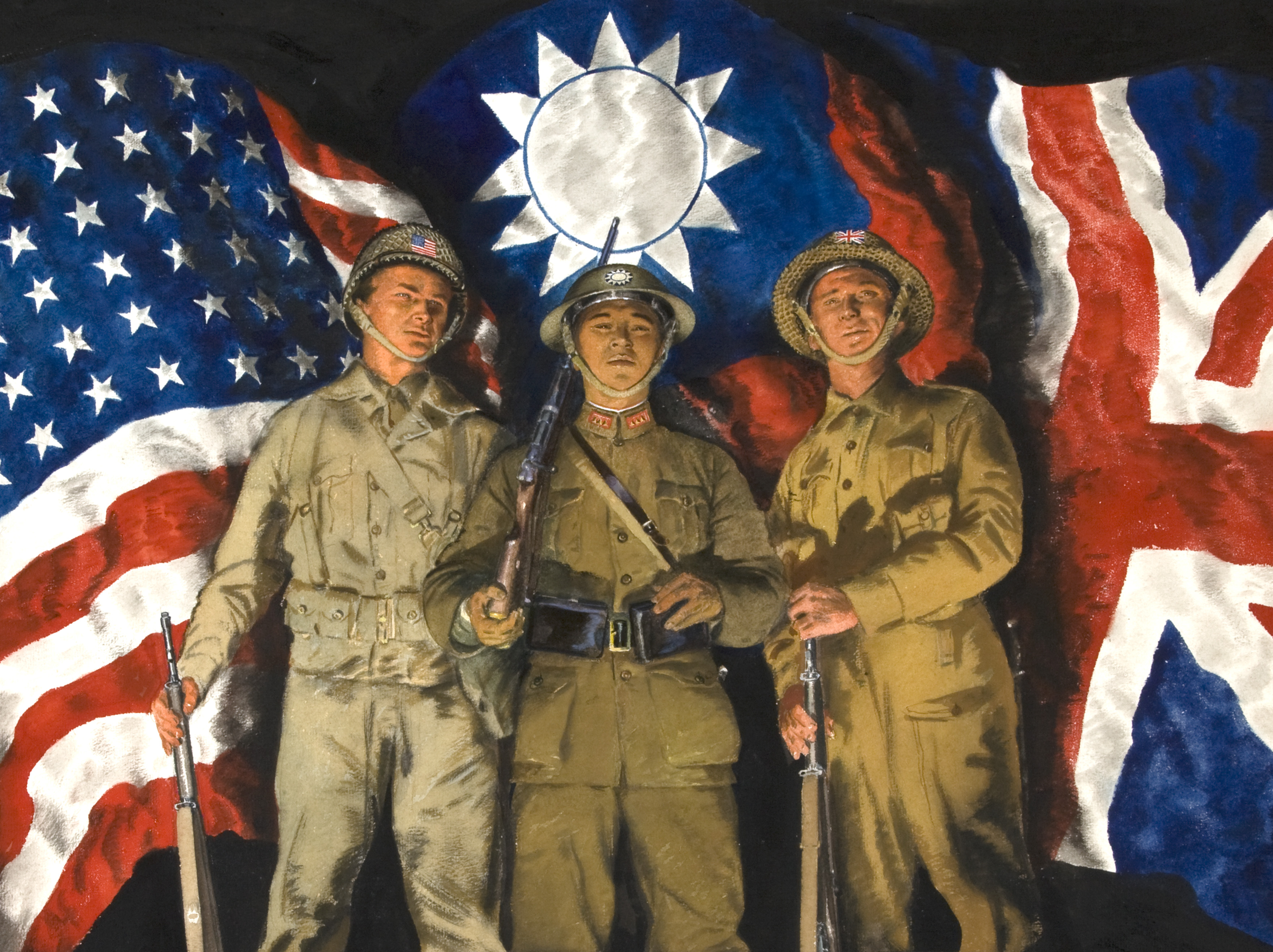
An Allied propaganda poster of a US, a Chinese, and a British soldier lining up in front of their national flags.

Winston Churchill called the association of the United Kingdom, United States, Soviet Union and other Allies the "Grand Alliance". The "Big Three"—the United Kingdom, United States and Soviet Union—were the principal contributors of manpower, resources and strategy, each playing a key role in achieving victory. The United States also saw China and its leader Chiang Kai-shek as its main ally in Asia and considered it one of the "Big Four" allied powers, a view not always shared by the United Kingdom and Soviet Union.

=== Declaration by United Nations ===
In December 1941, at the First Washington Conference, Roosevelt proposed the name "United Nations" for the Allies and Churchill agreed. On 1 January 1942, Roosevelt, Churchill and representatives of the Soviet Union and China signed the Declaration by United Nations. The following day, representatives of 22 other allied countries signed the declaration. The Free French were not invited to sign because the United States recognized the Vichy government in France. The 26 original signatories were:

- United States
- United Kingdom
- Soviet Union
- (Republic of China (1912–1949)) China
- Australia
- Belgium
- Canada
- Costa Rica
- Cuba
- (Czech Republic) Czechoslovakia
- Dominican Republic
- El Salvador
- (Kingdom of Greece) Greece
- Guatemala
- Haiti
- Honduras
- (British Raj) British India
- Luxembourg
- Netherlands
- (Dominion of New Zealand) New Zealand
- Nicaragua
- Norway
- Panama
- (Second Polish Republic) Poland
- (Union of South Africa) South Africa
- (Kingdom of Yugoslavia) Yugoslavia

From this time, countries that adopted the declaration were considered allies. Mexico, the Philippines and Ethiopia adopted the declaration later in 1942, followed by Iraq, Brazil, Bolivia, Iran and Colombia in 1943, and Liberia in February 1944. Following the liberation of France, the French provisional government signed the declaration on 26 December 1944 and France officially became one of the allied nations. Eleven nations adhered to the declaration in early 1945, when an allied victory over Germany was assured and the Big Four powers were preparing to invite signatories to the San Francisco Conference to prepare a charter for the new United Nations organization.

=== Major conferences ===
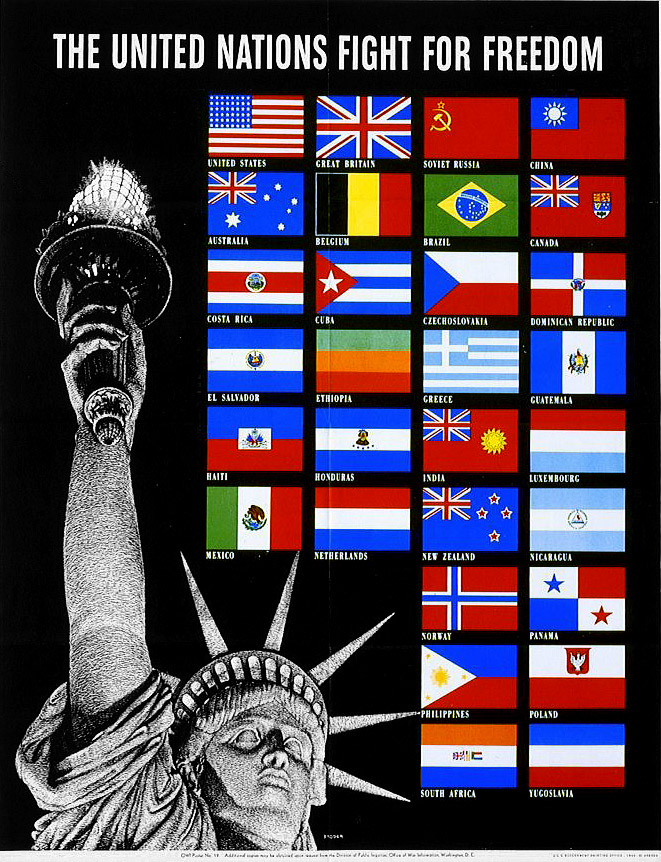
Wartime poster for the United Nations, created in 1941 by the U.S. Office of War Information

A series of conferences between the major allied leaders, diplomats, and military officials shaped the strategic direction of the war and the post-war international order. Churchill and Roosevelt attended the first Washington Conference (December 1941 – January 1942) where they established the Combined Chiefs of Staff Committee and agreed to prioritize the European and North African theatres in the war. Churchill and Roosevelt met again at Casablanca (January 1943) and Washington (May 1943) where they decided on an invasion of Sicily, the postponement of a landing in France until May 1944, and began planning a counter-offensive against Japan in Asia and the Pacific. At the first Quebec Conference (August 1943) Churchill and Roosevelt agreed to a new command structure in South-East Asia.

Churchill, Roosevelt and Chiang met at the Cairo Conference (November 1943) where they discussed operations against Japan and issued the Cairo Declaration outlining their vision for post-war Asia whereby Japan would lose all the territories it had gained since 1914. Stalin declined to attend or send representatives as the Soviet Union was not at war with Japan. Churchill, Roosevelt and Stalin met for the first time at the Tehran Conference (November – December 1943) where they decided that the full-scale offensive in France in mid-1944 was the allied priority and where Stalin announced that he would declare war on Japan once Hitler was defeated. At the Yalta Conference (February 1945) Churchill, Roosevelt and Stalin agreed to zones of occupation for the soon-to-be-defeated Germany and made plans for the post-war settlement of Europe and the United Nations organization. Following the allied victory in Europe, the new US president, Harry S. Truman, and new British prime minister, Clement Attlee, attended the final summit of the Big Three leaders at Potsdam (July – August 1945) where they discussed the final operations against Japan and issued a demand for its unconditional surrender.

=== Cooperation and tensions among Big Four ===
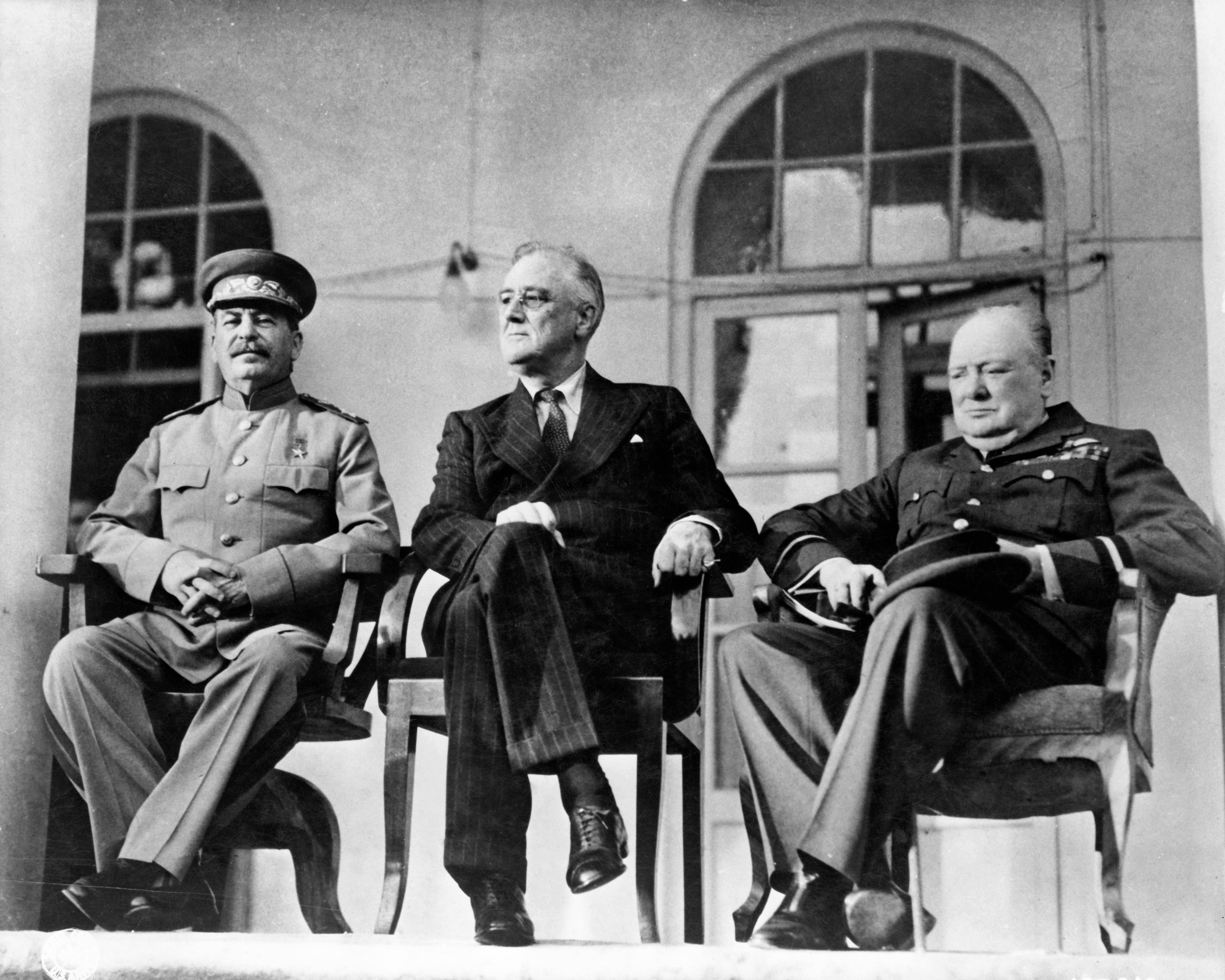
The Allied leaders of the European theatre (left to right): Joseph Stalin, Franklin D. Roosevelt and Winston Churchill meeting at the Tehran Conference in 1943

Relations between the United Kingdom and United States were especially close. (Note: "The Anglo-American alliance was the most formidable, intricate and, in many ways, harmonious military alliance in history." See Bouverie (2025) p. xii.) Before they were formally allied, they had cooperated in a number of ways, notably through the destroyers-for-bases deal in September 1940 and the American Lend-Lease program, which provided Britain and the other allies with war materiel from March 1941. The British Commonwealth and empire obtained about half of the $42 to $50 billion in lend-lease aid during the war. The British Commonwealth and, to a lesser extent, the French empire and Soviet Union reciprocated with a smaller Reverse Lend-Lease program worth about $8 billion. After the United States entered the war, the United Kingdom and the United States established a Combined Chiefs of Staff to harmonize military planning, and Combined Boards to co-ordinate shipping, raw materials, and war production.

Churchill and Roosevelt also met nine times in conferences without the presence of the other Big Four leaders. At the First Washington Conference, held soon after the United States entered the war, they agreed that Germany should be first defeated before focusing their forces on Japan. Nevertheless, divisions between the United Kingdom and United States soon arose over strategy for the defeat of Germany. American planners pushed for a landing in France in 1942 followed by a full scale invasion 1943. Britain, however, argued that an early invasion of France risked being repulsed with heavy allied losses. Instead, they argued for weakening Germany through strategic bombing and economic warfare and dispersing Axis forces by opening fronts in French north Africa, Italy, and possibly the Balkans. The United States and United Kingdom ultimately agreed to delay a full scale of invasion of France until May or June 1944, which angered Stalin because the Soviet Union was suffering heavy losses on its front with Germany.

There were also significant disagreements between the United Kingdom and United States about the Asia-Pacific front. While Churchill prioritized the recovery of British imperial possessions such as Burma, Malaya, Hong Kong and Singapore, the Americans were more focused on supporting China by reopening its overland supply lines from India through the Burma road. Roosevelt and Chiang were hostile to imperialism and pressed Churchill to reach an agreement with the leaders of the Indian independence movement and to agree to post-war mandates for British and French imperial possessions to prepare them for full independence.

Despite their ideological differences and severe tensions over the timing of an invasion of France, the Soviet Union and its western allies cooperated in a number of ways. On the political front, the Soviet Union signed the Anglo-Soviet Agreement in July 1941, endorsed the Atlantic Charter in September, signed the Declaration by United Nations in January 1942, the Anglo-Soviet Treaty in May 1942, and the Four Powers Declaration in October 1943. In May 1943, Stalin agreed to dissolve the Comintern as a gesture of goodwill. On the strategic front, the Big Three agreed at the Tehran conference of late 1943 that an invasion of France was the military priority for 1944. On the military front, in August 1941, British and Soviet forces invaded neutral Iran, which they suspected was pro-Axis, to secure oil supplies and the overland supply route into the Soviet Union. The western allies sought to relieve pressure on the Soviet front by its strategic bombing campaign and economic warfare on Germany and by diverting Axis forces to the north African and Italian fronts. Western food and materiel aid to the Soviet Union was also of great importance. The United States supplied the Soviet Union with $10 billion worth of aid under lend-lease: equivalent to 7% of Soviet war production. The Soviet Union, in turn, prosecuted the bulk of the ground war in which an estimated 5 million Axis soldiers were killed or missing in action on the eastern front.

A rift developed between the Soviet Union and the western allies over the political settlement of postwar Europe. The Soviet Union pressed the United Kingdom and United States to recognise the territorial gains it had made in the Baltic states, Finland, Bessarabia and eastern Poland before the German invasion. The United Kingdom and United States rejected these demands as incompatible with the Atlantic Charter principle of no territorial changes without the consent of the people concerned. US and British concerns over Stalin's intentions increased when the Soviet Union severed relations with the Polish government-in-exile in April 1943, established a rival Polish Committee of National Liberation in June 1944, and failed to assist the Warsaw uprising (August to October 1944) until it was too late. Nevertheless, the Big Three reached a secret agreement at the Tehran Conference to move Poland's eastern border to the Curzon line, and, in October 1944, Churchill and Stalin reached a private agreement over Soviet and western spheres of influence in Romania, Bulgaria, Yugoslavia, Hungary and Greece. Despite their remaining differences over the borders and political future of the territories they occupied, the Big Three alliance held to the end of the war. On 8 August 1945, six days before Japan's surrender, the Soviet Union honoured its commitment to enter the war against Japan.

The Allied leaders of the Pacific War: Chiang Kai-shek, Franklin D. Roosevelt, and Winston Churchill meeting at the Cairo Conference in 1943

Roosevelt viewed China as an important ally in the war against Japan and as a potential counterweight to Soviet influence in the postwar world. The United States saw allied military bases in China as staging posts for an eventual invasion of Japan and, in the meantime, Chinese nationalist forces tied up 500,000 to 600,000 Japanese troops in central China. The United States provided loans and lend-lease aid to the nationalist government and, in December 1941, Chiang was named Supreme Allied Commander for China, Thailand and Indo-China. In October 1942, the United States and United Kingdom agreed to relinquish their territorial concessions and other privileges under their unequal treaties with China. In October 1943, the United States, United Kingdom, Soviet Union and China signed the Four Power Declaration in which they pledged to cooperate against their common enemies and establish an international organization for peace and security. At the Tehran Conference later that year, Roosevelt outlined his vision of China as one of the "four policemen" of the postwar world.

Senior officials in the Big Three powers, however, were critical of the corruption and inefficiency of the nationalist government and its military forces. There were also strategic differences between Chiang, who wanted a higher priority on the war against Japan, and the Big Three leaders who had agreed on a policy of defeating Germany first. Relations between Chiang and his American chief-of-staff Joseph Stilwell were particularly tense. Stilwell believed the Chinese forces lacked adequate training, supplies and leadership, while Chiang blamed Stilwell's insistence on diverting Chinese forces to the Burma campaign for the collapse of the nationalist army during Japan's China offensive of 1944. Chiang's standing with the other allied leaders was weakened by the poor performance of his army during this offensive and by the US adoption of the island hopping strategy against Japan which reduced the importance of bases in China. Chiang was not invited to the Yalta and Potsdam conferences of 1945.

== Major Allied states ==
=== United Kingdom and British Empire ===
At the outbreak of the war, the British Empire comprised over 60 countries including the dominions, India, Burma, and numerous Crown colonies and protectorates. Following Britain's declaration of war on Germany on 3 September 1939, most of the empire was automatically at war. However, the dominions of Australia, Canada, New Zealand and South Africa separately declared war in the following two weeks.

Following the defeat of Poland in October 1939 and of France in June 1940, the UK took the lead in coordinating the war effort of its empire and the allied governments-in-exile in London. When the Soviet Union joined the Allies after the Axis invasion of June 1941 and the United States and China joined in December that year, the UK was the de facto representative of the empire and allied governments-in-exile in their dealings with the other Big Four powers.

Britain sustained its war effort by drawing on the population, raw material and strategic bases of its colonies throughout the world. In 1939, the population of the empire, including the dominions, was about 484 million, making it the second most populous belligerent after China. Britain’s colonies accounted for 42% of the empire’s economic output. After Japan occupied most of Britain's Asia-Pacific colonies – including Hong Kong, Burma, Malaya and Singapore – from December 1941, Britain expanded the production of food and manufacturing in India and the African colonies.

Britain’s colonies also made a significant contribution to the allied military effort. By 1945, 25% of the allied South-East Asia Command was African and about 4% of the empire's military dead were from the colonies other than India.

In 1939 Britain had the second largest navy and largest merchant navy in the world, and these played a vital role in transporting troops, armaments, food and raw materials for the Allies. The British military played a major role in defeating the Axis powers in North Africa, Italy and the Western Front British and colonial troops also cleared Japanese forces from Burma. Britain and the United States conducted the Combined Bomber Offensive against Germany from 1943 which diverted German resources from the Eastern Front and retarded German war production.

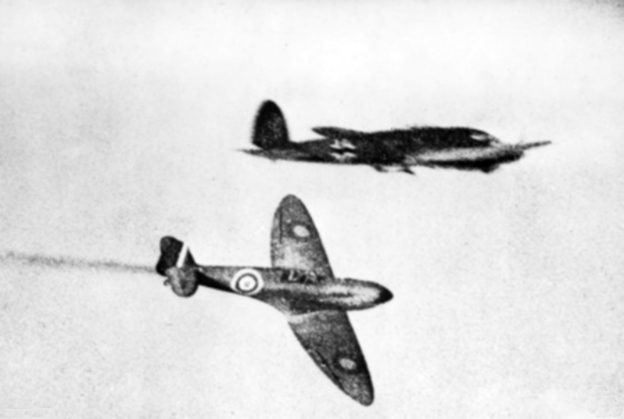
British Supermarine Spitfire fighter aircraft (bottom) flying past a German Heinkel He 111 bomber aircraft (top) during the Battle of Britain in 1940

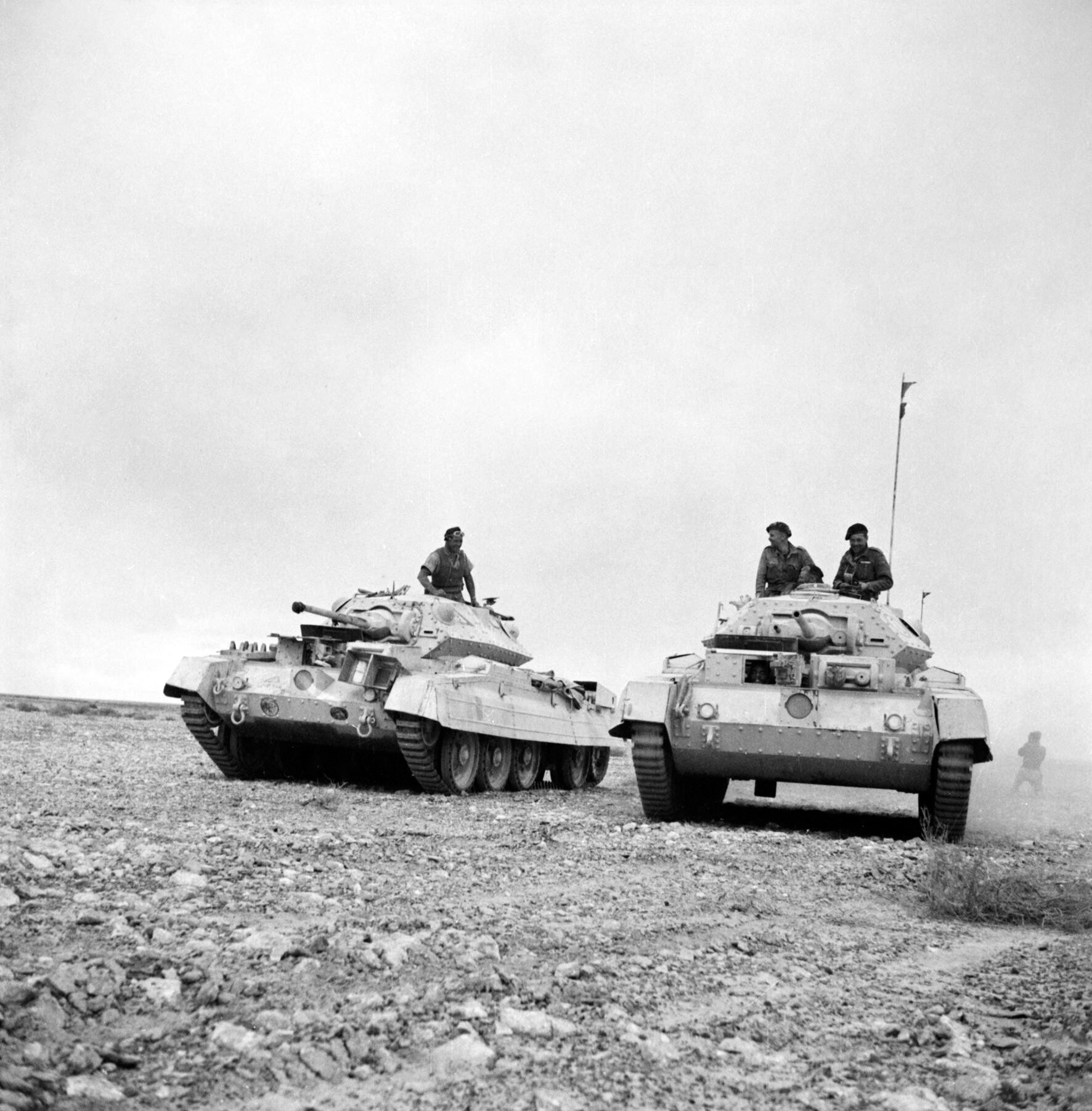
British Crusader tanks during the North African Campaign

British aircraft carrier HMS Ark Royal under attack from Italian aircraft during the Battle of Cape Spartivento (27 November 1940)

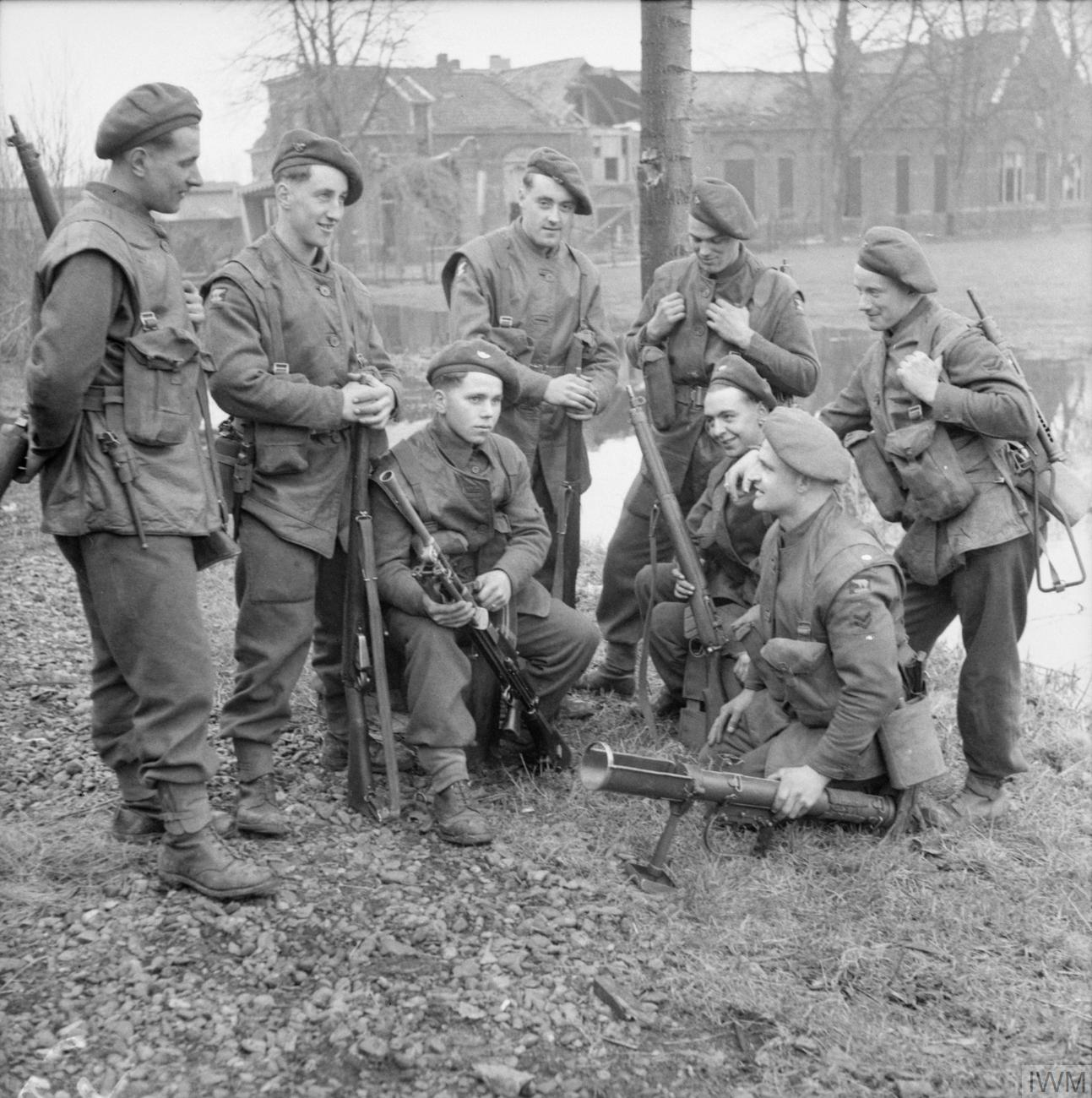
British soldiers of the King's Own Yorkshire Light Infantry in Elst, Netherlands on 2 March 1945

==== India ====
About two-thirds of India was under the direct rule of the United Kingdom exercised by a viceroy representing the British crown. The other third mostly consisted of princely states, nominally under Indian rulers subordinate to the British crown. Nevertheless, India separately signed the Declaration by United Nations on 2 January 1942, and signed the Paris Peace Treaties of February 1947 as an Allied Power.

India was an important supply base for Commonwealth, American and Chinese forces and itself produced about £286.5 million worth of military equipment and other supplies. By 1945, the Indian army numbered 2.5 million people – the largest volunteer army in history. Indian troops played a major role in the Burma campaign and in other theaters. Its military losses were about 100,000 killed, wounded or missing, and almost 80,000 taken prisoner. An estimated 3 million Indian people died in the Bengal famine of 1943.

=== France ===
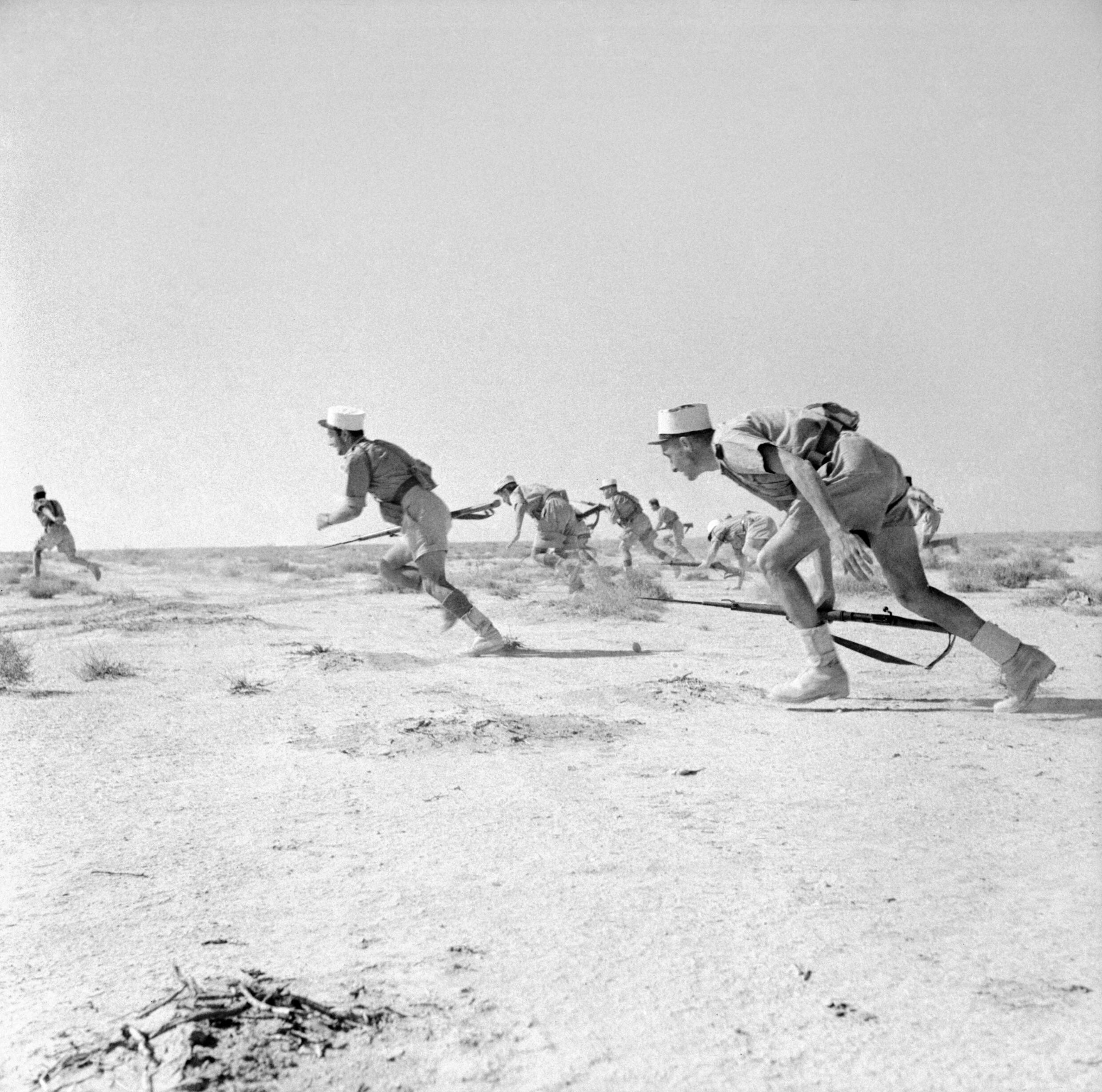
Free French forces at the Battle of Bir Hakeim, 1942

==== War declared ====
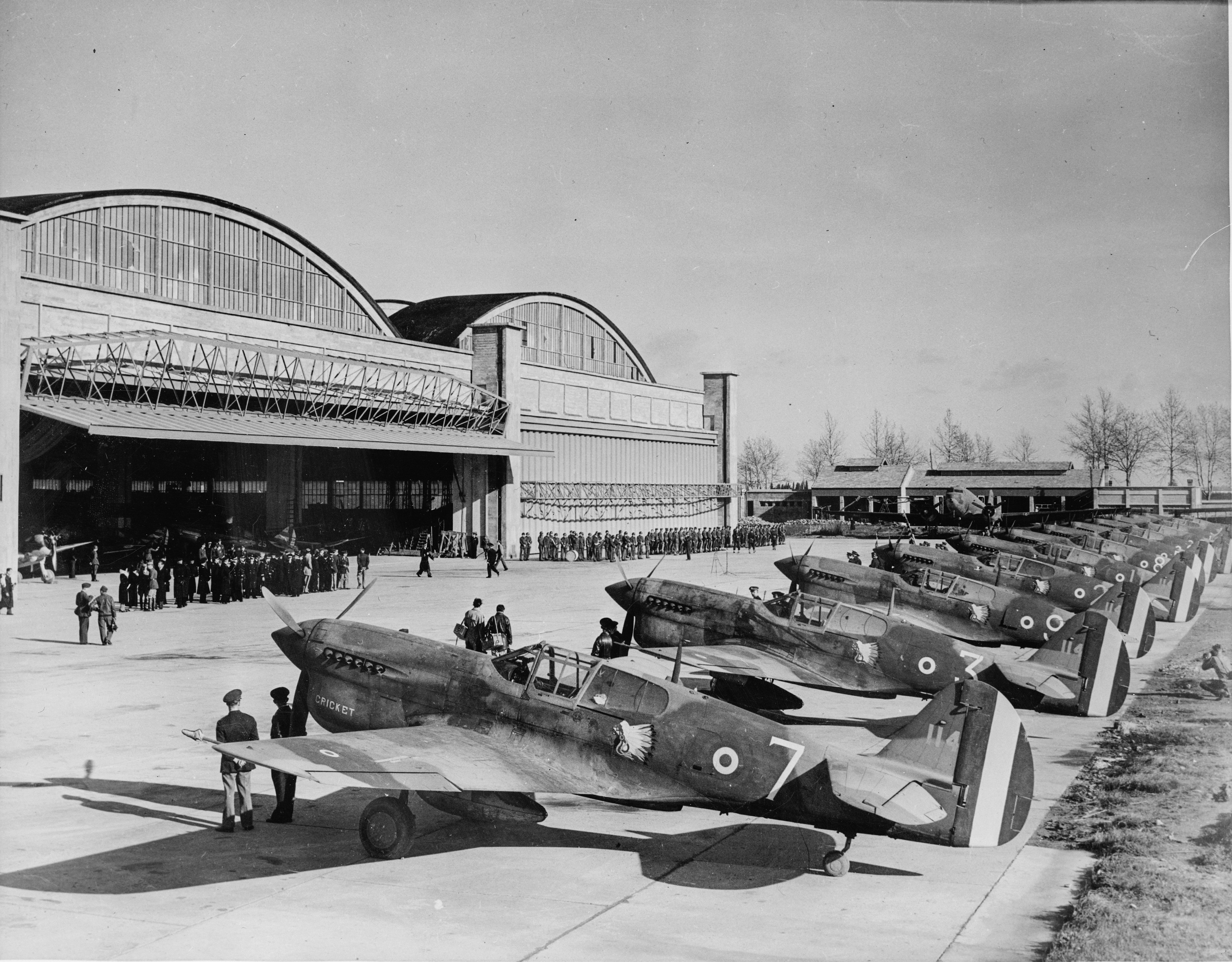
FAFL Free French GC II/5 "LaFayette" receiving ex-USAAF Curtiss P-40 fighters at Casablanca, French Morocco

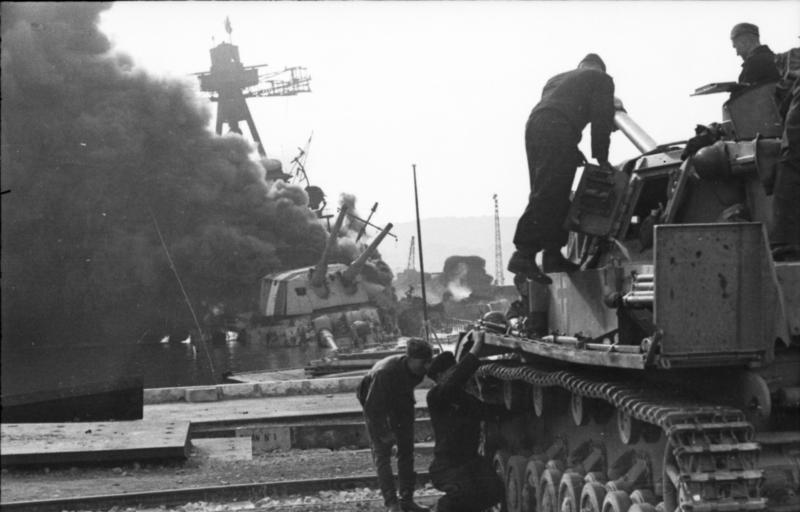
The French fleet scuttled itself rather than fall into the hands of the Axis after their invasion of Vichy France on 11 November 1942.

After Germany invaded Poland, France declared war on Germany on 3 September 1939. In January 1940, French Prime Minister Édouard Daladier made a major speech denouncing the actions of Germany:

At the end of five months of war, one thing has become more and more clear. It is that Germany seeks to establish a domination of the world completely different from any known in world history.

The domination at which the Nazis aim is not limited to the displacement of the balance of power and the imposition of the supremacy of one nation. It seeks the systematic and total destruction of those conquered by Hitler and it does not treaty with the nations which it has subdued. He destroys them. He takes from them their whole political and economic existence and seeks even to deprive them of their history and culture. He wishes only to consider them as vital space and a vacant territory over which he has every right.

The human beings who constitute these nations are for him only cattle. He orders their massacre or migration. He compels them to make room for their conquerors. He does not even take the trouble to impose any war tribute on them. He just takes all their wealth and, to prevent any revolt, he scientifically seeks the physical and moral degradation of those whose independence he has taken away.

France experienced several major phases of action during World War II:

- The "Phoney War" of 1939–1940, also called drôle de guerre in France, dziwna wojna in Poland (both meaning "Strange War"), or the Sitzkrieg ("Sitting War", a pun on Blitzkrieg) in Germany.
- The Battle of France in May–June 1940, which resulted in the defeat of the Allies, the fall of the French Third Republic, the German occupation of northern and western France, and the creation of the rump state Vichy France, which received diplomatic recognition from the Axis and most neutral countries including the United States.
- The period of resistance against the occupation and Franco-French struggle for control of the colonies between the Vichy regime and the Free French, who continued the fight on the Allies' side after the Appeal of 18 June by General Charles de Gaulle, recognized by the United Kingdom as France's government-in-exile. It culminated in the Allied landings in North Africa on 11 November 1942, when Vichy ceased to exist as an independent entity after having been invaded by both the Axis and the Allies simultaneously, being thereafter only the nominal government in charge during the occupation of France. Vichy forces in French North Africa switched allegiance and merged with the Free French to participate in the campaigns of Tunisia and of Italy and the invasion of Corsica in 1943–44.
- The liberation of mainland France beginning with D-Day on 6 June 1944 and operation Overlord, and then with operation Dragoon on 15 August 1944, leading to the Liberation of Paris on 25 August 1944 by the Free French 2e Division Blindée and the installation of the Provisional Government of the French Republic in the newly liberated capital.
- Participation of the re-established provisional French Republic's First Army in the Allied advance from Paris to the Rhine and the Western Allied invasion of Germany until V-E Day on 8 May 1945.

==== Colonies and dependencies ====
===== Africa =====
In Africa these included: French West Africa, French Equatorial Africa, the League of Nations mandates of French Cameroun and French Togoland, French Madagascar, French Somaliland, and the protectorates of French Tunisia and French Morocco.

French Algeria was then not a colony or dependency but a fully-fledged part of metropolitan France.

===== Asia and Oceania =====
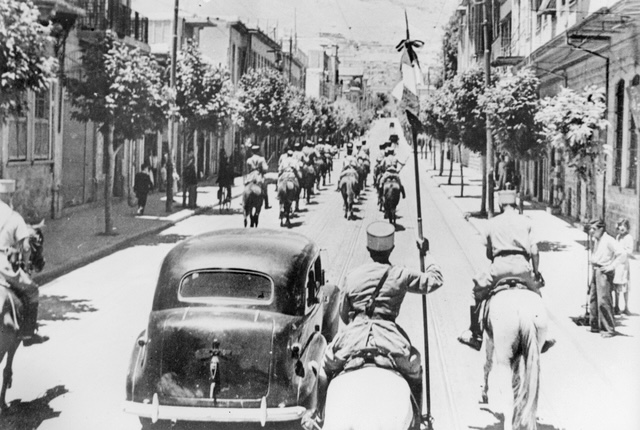
The fall of Damascus to the Allies, late June 1941. A car carrying Free French commanders General Georges Catroux and General Paul Louis Le Gentilhomme enters the city, escorted by French Circassian cavalry (Gardes tcherkesses).

In Asia and Oceania France has several territories: French Polynesia, Wallis and Futuna, New Caledonia, the New Hebrides, French Indochina, French India, Guangzhouwan, the mandates of Greater Lebanon and French Syria. The French government in 1936 attempted to grant independence to its mandate of Syria in the Franco-Syrian Treaty of Independence of 1936 signed by France and Syria. However, opposition to the treaty grew in France and the treaty was not ratified. Syria had become an official republic in 1930 and was largely self-governing. In 1941, a British-led invasion supported by Free French forces expelled Vichy French forces in Operation Exporter.

===== Americas =====
France had several colonies in America, namely Martinique, Guadeloupe, French Guiana and Saint Pierre and Miquelon.

=== Soviet Union ===
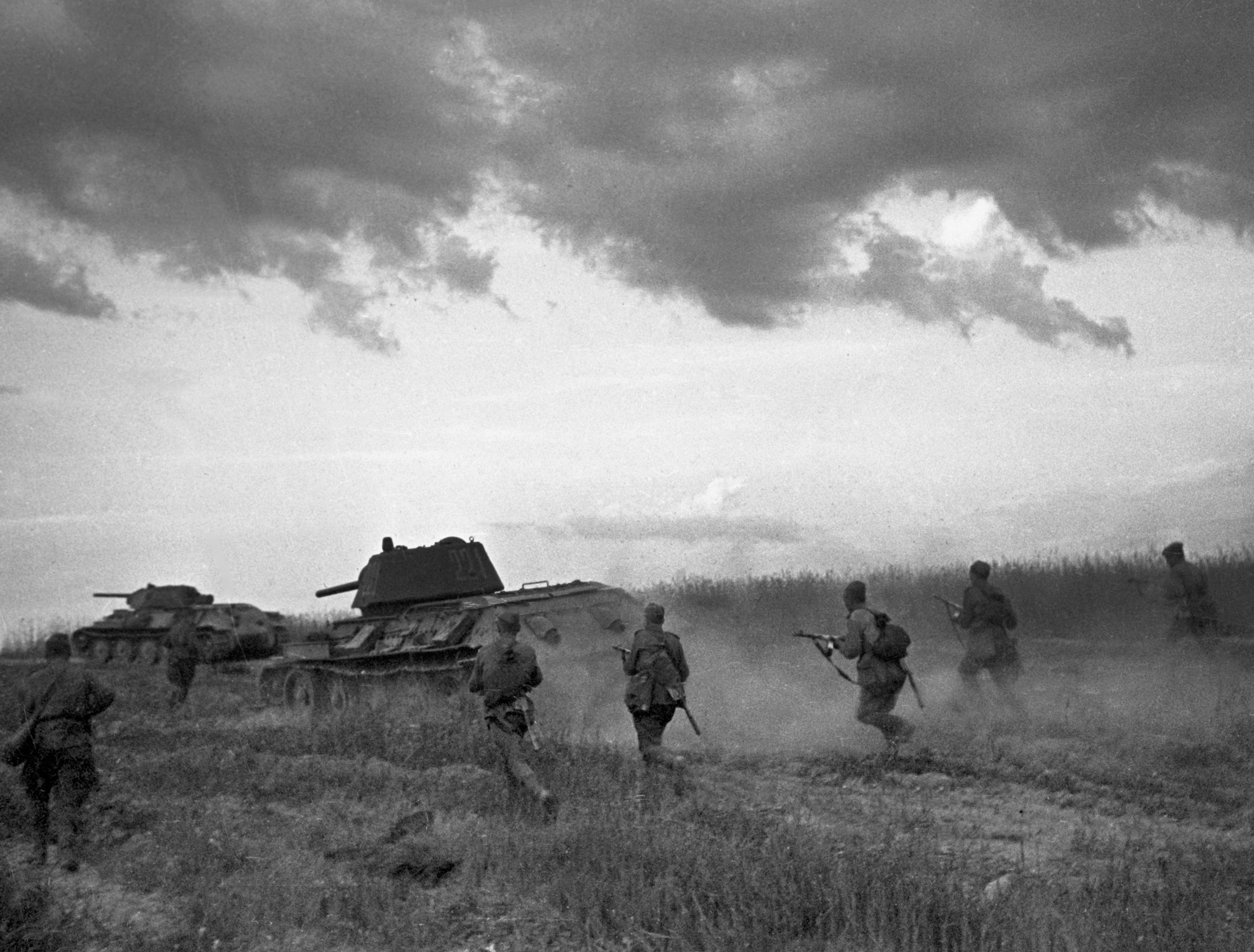
Soviet soldiers and T-34 tanks advancing near Bryansk in 1942

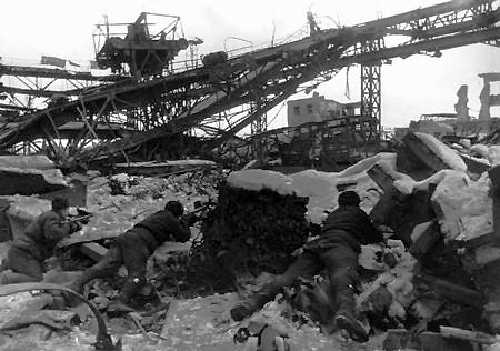
Soviet soldiers fighting in the ruins of Stalingrad during the Battle of Stalingrad

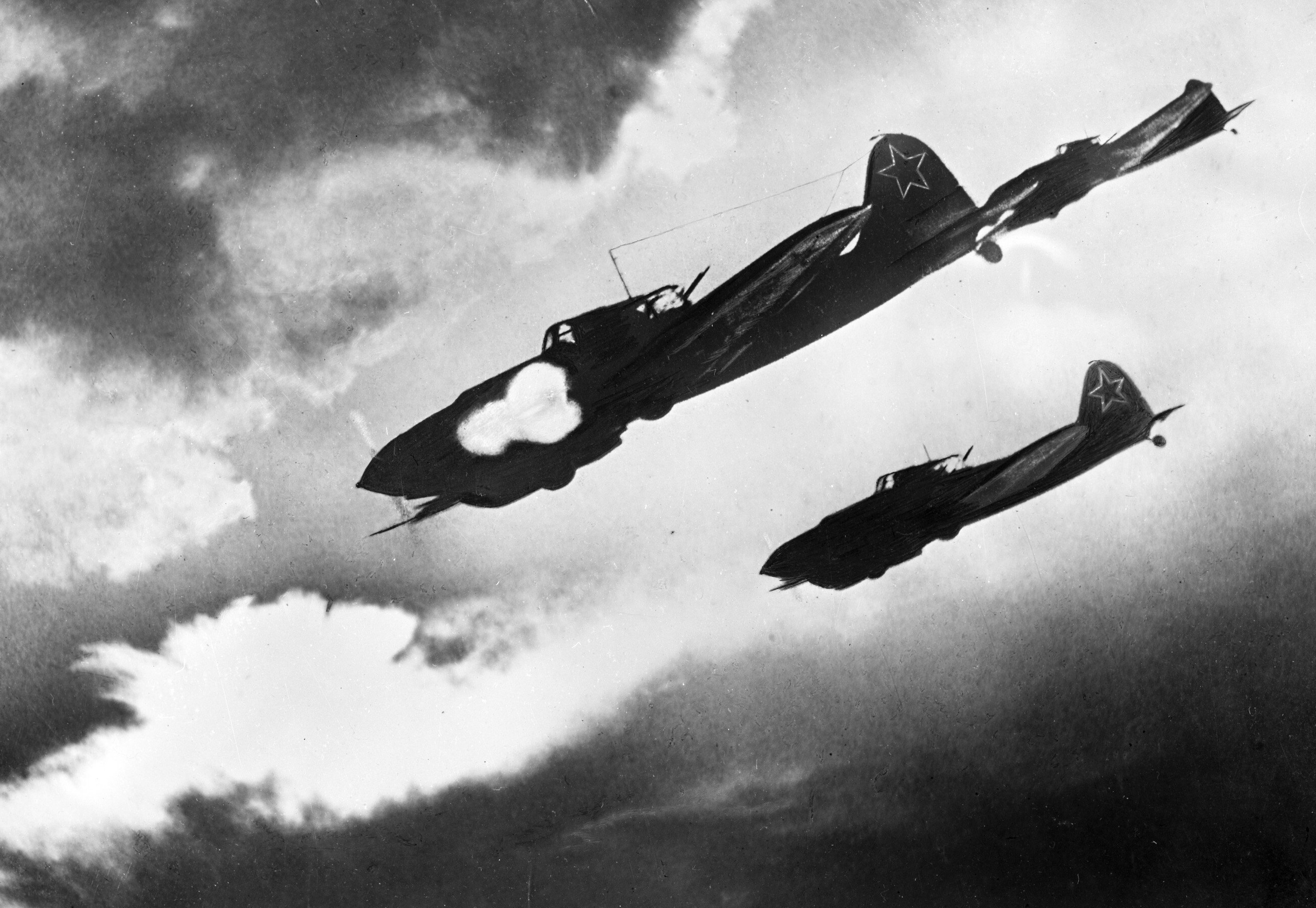
Soviet Il-2 ground attack aircraft attacking German ground forces during the Battle of Kursk, 1943

==== History ====
In the lead-up to the war between the Soviet Union and Nazi Germany, relations between the two states underwent several stages. General Secretary Joseph Stalin and the government of the Soviet Union had supported so-called popular front movements of anti-fascists including communists and non-communists from 1935 to 1939. The popular front strategy was terminated from 1939 to 1941, when the Soviet Union cooperated with Germany in 1939 in the occupation and partitioning of Poland. The Soviet leadership refused to endorse either the Allies or the Axis from 1939 to 1941, as it called the Allied-Axis conflict an "imperialist war".

Stalin had studied Hitler, including reading Mein Kampf, and from it knew of Hitler's motives for destroying the Soviet Union. As early as in 1933, the Soviet leadership voiced its concerns with the alleged threat of a potential German invasion of the country should Germany attempt a conquest of Lithuania, Latvia, or Estonia, and in December 1933 negotiations began for the issuing of a joint Polish-Soviet declaration guaranteeing the sovereignty of the three Baltic countries. However, Poland withdrew from the negotiations following German and Finnish objections. The Soviet Union and Germany at this time competed with each other for influence in Poland.

On 20 August 1939, forces of the Union of Soviet Socialist Republics under General Georgy Zhukov, together with the People's Republic of Mongolia eliminated the threat of conflict in the east with a victory over Imperial Japan at the Battle of Khalkhin Gol in eastern Mongolia.

On the same day, Soviet party leader Joseph Stalin received a telegram from German Chancellor Adolf Hitler, suggesting that German Foreign Minister Joachim von Ribbentrop fly to Moscow for diplomatic talks. (After receiving a lukewarm response throughout the spring and summer, Stalin abandoned attempts for a better diplomatic relationship with France and the United Kingdom.)

On 23 August, Ribbentrop and Soviet Foreign Minister Vyacheslav Molotov signed the non-aggression pact including secret protocols dividing Eastern Europe into defined "spheres of influence" for the two regimes, and specifically concerning the partition of the Polish state in the event of its "territorial and political rearrangement".

On 15 September 1939, Stalin concluded a durable ceasefire with Japan, to take effect the following day (it would be upgraded to a non-aggression pact in April 1941). The day after that, 17 September, Soviet forces invaded Poland from the east. Although some fighting continued until 5 October, the two invading armies held at least one joint military parade on 25 September, and reinforced their non-military partnership with the German–Soviet Treaty of Friendship, Cooperation and Demarcation on 28 September. German and Soviet cooperation against Poland in 1939 has been described as co-belligerence.

On 30 November, the Soviet Union attacked Finland, for which it was expelled from the League of Nations. In the following year of 1940, while the world's attention was focused upon the German invasion of France and Norway, the Soviet Union militarily occupied and annexed Estonia, Latvia, and Lithuania as well as parts of Romania.

German-Soviet treaties were brought to an end by the German surprise attack on the Soviet Union on 22 June 1941. After the invasion of the Soviet Union in 1941, Stalin endorsed the Western Allies as part of a renewed popular front strategy against Germany and called for the international communist movement to make a coalition with all those who opposed the Nazis. The Soviet Union soon entered in alliance with the United Kingdom. Following the Soviet Union, a number of other communist, pro-Soviet or Soviet-controlled forces fought against the Axis powers during the Second World War. They were as follows: the Albanian National Liberation Front, the Chinese Red Army, the Greek National Liberation Front, the Hukbalahap, the Malayan Communist Party, the People's Republic of Mongolia, the Polish People's Army, the Tuvan People's Republic (annexed by the Soviet Union in 1944), the Viet Minh and the Yugoslav Partisans.

The Soviet Union intervened against Japan and its client state in Manchuria in 1945, cooperating with the Nationalist Government of China and the Nationalist Party led by Chiang Kai-shek; though also cooperating, preferring, and encouraging the Chinese Communist Party led by Mao Zedong to take effective control of Manchuria after expelling Japanese forces.

==== Central Asian and Caucasian Republics ====
Among the Soviet forces during World War II, millions of troops were from the Soviet Central Asian Republics. They included 1,433,230 soldiers from Uzbekistan, more than 1 million from Kazakhstan, and more than 700,000 from Azerbaijan, among other Central Asian Republics.

=== United States ===
==== History ====
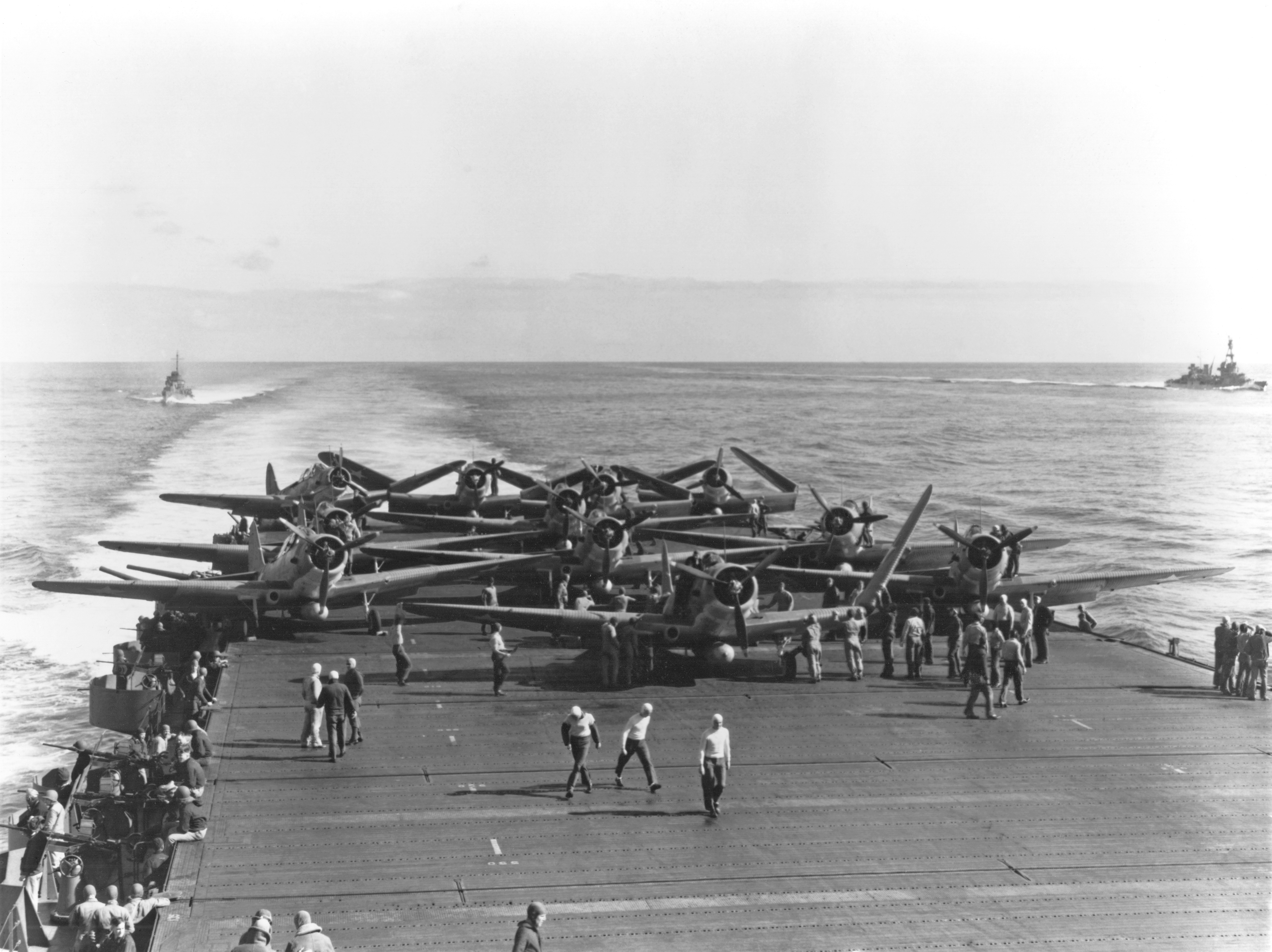
American Douglas TBD Devastator torpedo-bombers onboard the USS Enterprise during the Battle of Midway, 4 June 1942

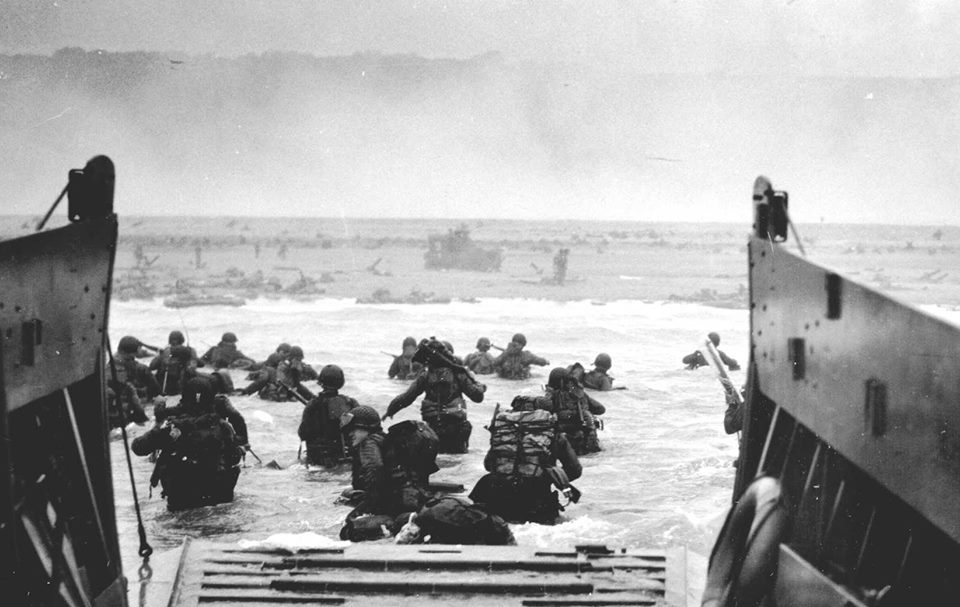
U.S. soldiers departing landing craft during the Normandy landings on 6 June 1944 known as D-Day

The United States had indirectly supported Britain's war effort against Germany up to 1941 and declared its opposition to territorial aggrandizement. Materiel support to Britain was provided while the U.S. was officially neutral via the Lend-Lease Act starting in 1941.

President Franklin D. Roosevelt and Prime Minister Winston Churchill in August 1941 promulgated the Atlantic Charter that pledged commitment to achieving "the final destruction of Nazi tyranny". Signing the Atlantic Charter, and thereby joining the "United Nations" was the way a state joined the Allies, and also became eligible for membership in the United Nations world body that formed in 1945.

The United States strongly supported the Nationalist Government in China in its war with Japan, and provided military equipment, supplies, and volunteers to the Nationalist Government of China to assist in its war effort. In December 1941 Japan opened the war with its attack on Pearl Harbor, the United States declared war on Japan, and Japan's allies Germany and Italy declared war on the United States, bringing the United States into World War II.

The United States played a central role in liaising among the Allies and especially among the Big Four. At the Arcadia Conference in December 1941, shortly after the United States entered the war, the United States and Britain established a Combined Chiefs of Staff, based in Washington, which deliberated the military decisions of both the United States and Britain.

On 8 December 1941, following the attack on Pearl Harbor, the United States Congress declared war on Japan at the request of President Franklin D. Roosevelt. This was followed by Germany and Italy declaring war on the United States on 11 December, bringing the country into the European theatre.

The United States led Allied forces in the Pacific theatre against Japanese forces from 1941 to 1945. From 1943 to 1945, the United States also led and coordinated the Western Allies' war effort in Europe under the leadership of General Dwight D. Eisenhower.

The surprise attack on Pearl Harbor followed by Japan's swift attacks on Allied locations throughout the Pacific, resulted in major United States losses in the first several months in the war, including losing control of the Philippines, Guam, Wake Island and several Aleutian islands including Attu and Kiska to Japanese forces. American naval forces attained some early successes against Japan. One was the bombing of Japanese industrial centres in the Doolittle Raid. Another was repelling a Japanese invasion of Port Moresby in New Guinea during the Battle of the Coral Sea.

A major turning point in the Pacific War was the Battle of Midway where American naval forces were outnumbered by Japanese forces that had been sent to Midway to draw out and destroy American aircraft carriers in the Pacific and seize control of Midway that would place Japanese forces in proximity to Hawaii. However American forces managed to sink four of Japan's six large aircraft carriers that had initiated the attack on Pearl Harbor along with other attacks on Allied forces. Afterwards, the United States began an offensive against Japanese-captured positions. The Guadalcanal Campaign from 1942 to 1943 was a major contention point where Allied and Japanese forces struggled to gain control of Guadalcanal.

==== Colonies and dependencies ====
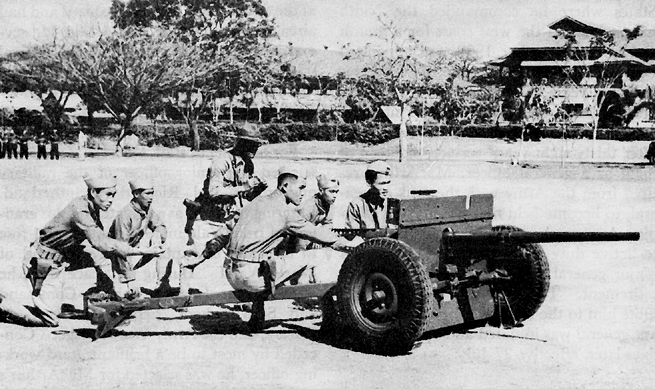
Philippine Scouts at Fort William McKinley firing a 37 mm anti-tank gun in training, circa 1941

The United States held multiple dependencies in the Americas, such as Alaska, the Panama Canal Zone, Puerto Rico, and the U.S. Virgin Islands. In the Pacific it held multiple island dependencies such as American Samoa, Guam, Hawaii, Midway Islands, Wake Island and others. These dependencies were directly involved in the Pacific campaign of the war.

The Commonwealth of the Philippines was a sovereign protectorate referred to as an "associated state" of the United States. From late 1941 to 1944, the Philippines was occupied by Japanese forces, who established the Second Philippine Republic as a client state that had nominal control over the country.

=== China ===
In the 1920s the Soviet Union provided military assistance to the Kuomintang, or the Nationalists, and helped reorganize their party along Leninist lines: a unification of party, state, and army. In exchange the Nationalists agreed to let members of the Chinese Communist Party join the Nationalists on an individual basis. However, following the nominal unification of China at the end of the Northern Expedition in 1928, Generalissimo Chiang Kai-shek purged leftists from his party and fought against the revolting Chinese Communist Party, former warlords, and other militarist factions.

A fragmented China provided easy opportunities for Japan to gain territories piece by piece without engaging in total war. Following the 1931 Mukden Incident, the puppet state of Manchukuo was established. Throughout the early to mid-1930s, Chiang's anti-communist and anti-militarist campaigns continued while he fought small, incessant conflicts against Japan, usually followed by unfavorable settlements and concessions after military defeats.

In 1936 Chiang was forced to cease his anti-communist military campaigns after his kidnap and release by Zhang Xueliang, and reluctantly formed a nominal alliance with the Communists, while the Communists agreed to fight under the nominal command of the Nationalists against the Japanese. Following the Marco Polo Bridge Incident of 7 July 1937, China and Japan became embroiled in a full-scale war. The Soviet Union, wishing to keep China in the fight against Japan, supplied China with military assistance until 1941, when it signed a non-aggression pact with Japan.

In December 1941 after the attack on Pearl Harbor, China formally declared war on Japan, as well as Germany and Italy. As part of the war's Pacific theater, China became the only member of the Allies to commit more troops than one of the Big Three, exceeding even the number of Soviet troops on the Eastern Front.

Continuous clashes between the Communists and Nationalists behind enemy lines cumulated in a major military conflict between these two former allies that effectively ended their cooperation against the Japanese, and China had been divided between the internationally recognized Nationalist China under the leadership of Generalissimo Chiang Kai-shek and Communist China under the leadership of Mao Zedong until the Japanese surrendered in 1945.

==== Factions ====
===== Nationalists =====
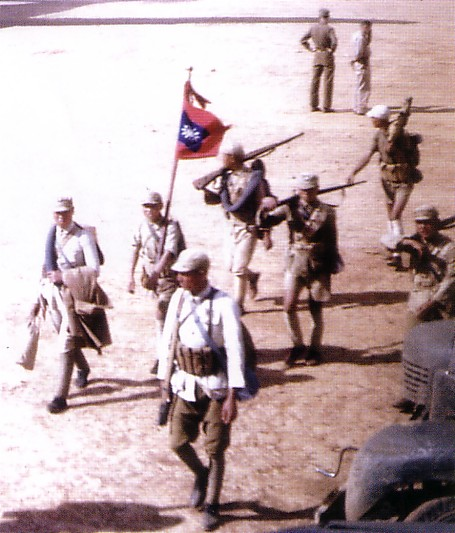
Soldiers of the National Revolutionary Army associated with Nationalist China, during the Second Sino-Japanese War

Prior to the alliance of Germany and Italy to Japan, the Nationalist Government held close relations with both Germany and Italy. In the early 1930s, Sino-German cooperation existed between the Nationalist Government and Germany in military and industrial matters. Nazi Germany provided the largest proportion of Chinese arms imports and technical expertise. Relations between the Nationalist Government and Italy during the 1930s varied, however even after the Nationalist Government followed League of Nations sanctions against Italy for its invasion of Ethiopia, the international sanctions proved unsuccessful, and relations between the Fascist government in Italy and the Nationalist Government in China returned to normal shortly afterwards.

Up until 1936, Mussolini had provided the Nationalists with Italian military air and naval missions to help the Nationalists fight against Japanese incursions and communist insurgents. Italy also held strong commercial interests and a strong commercial position in China supported by the Italian concession in Tianjin. However, after 1936 the relationship between the Nationalist Government and Italy changed due to a Japanese diplomatic proposal to recognize the Italian Empire that included occupied Ethiopia within it in exchange for Italian recognition of Manchukuo, Italian Foreign Minister Galeazzo Ciano accepted this offer by Japan, and on 23 October 1936 Japan recognized the Italian Empire and Italy recognized Manchukuo, as well as discussing increasing commercial links between Italy and Japan.

The Nationalist Government held close relations with the United States. The United States opposed Japan's invasion of China in 1937 that it considered an illegal violation of China's sovereignty, and offered the Nationalist Government diplomatic, economic, and military assistance during its war against Japan. In particular, the United States sought to bring the Japanese war effort to a complete halt by imposing a full embargo on all trade between the United States to Japan, Japan was dependent on the United States for 80 per cent of its petroleum, resulting in an economic and military crisis for Japan that could not continue its war effort with China without access to petroleum. In November 1940, American military aviator Claire Lee Chennault upon observing the dire situation in the air war between China and Japan, set out to organize a volunteer squadron of American fighter pilots to fight alongside the Chinese against Japan, known as the Flying Tigers. US President Franklin D. Roosevelt accepted dispatching them to China in early 1941. However, they only became operational shortly after the attack on Pearl Harbor.

The Soviet Union recognised the Republic of China but urged reconciliation with the Chinese Communist Party and inclusion of Communists in the government. The Soviet Union also urged military and cooperation between Nationalist China and Communist China during the war.

Even though China had been fighting the longest among all the Allied powers, it only officially joined the Allies after the attack on Pearl Harbor, on 7 December 1941. China fought the Japanese Empire before joining the Allies in the Pacific War. Generalissimo Chiang Kai-shek thought Allied victory was assured with the entrance of the United States into the war, and he declared war on Germany and the other Axis states. However, Allied aid remained low because the Burma Road was closed and the Allies suffered a series of military defeats against Japan early on in the campaign. General Sun Li-jen led the R.O.C. forces to the relief of 7,000 British forces trapped by the Japanese in the Battle of Yenangyaung. He then reconquered North Burma and re-established the land route to China by the Ledo Road. But the bulk of military aid did not arrive until the spring of 1945. More than 1.5 million Japanese troops were trapped in the China Theatre, troops that otherwise could have been deployed elsewhere if China had collapsed and made a separate peace.

===== Communists =====
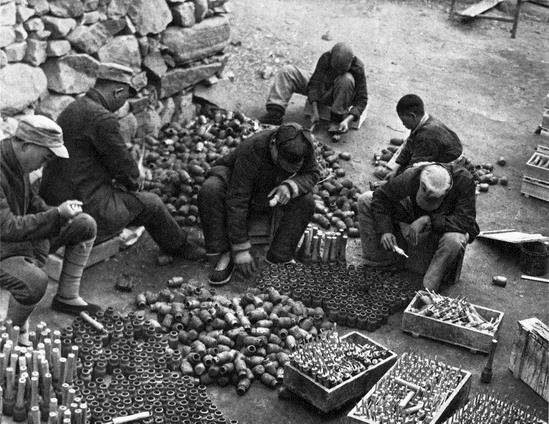
Soldiers of the First Workers' and Peasants' Army associated with Communist China, during the Sino-Japanese War

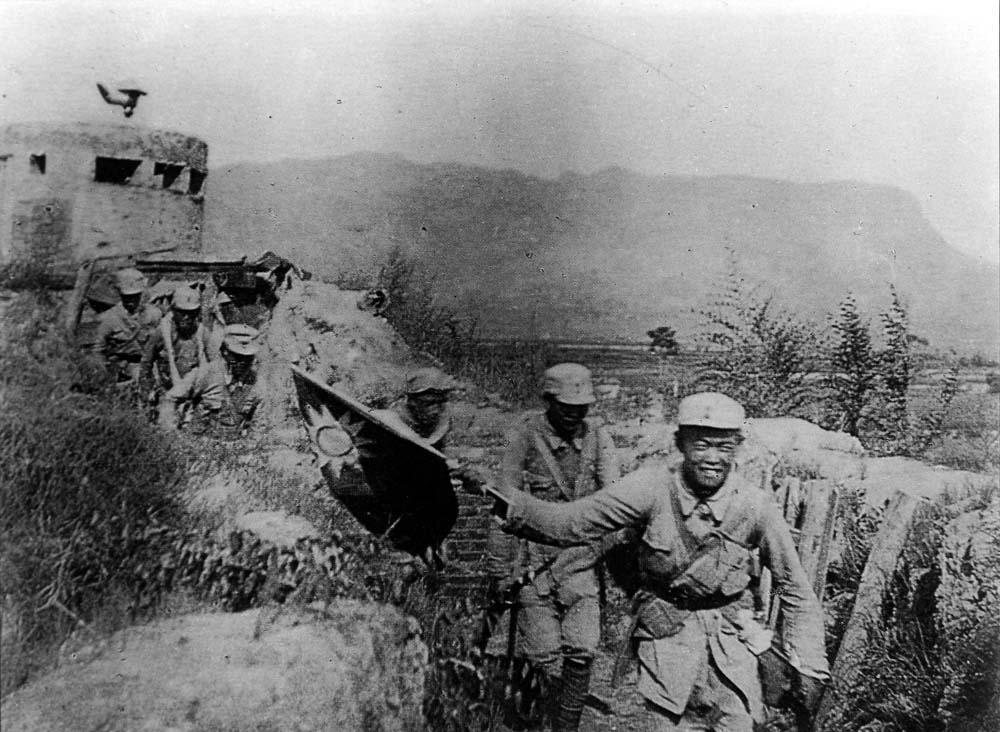
Victorious Chinese Communist soldiers holding the flag of the Republic of China during the Hundred Regiments Offensive

Communist China had been tacitly supported by the Soviet Union since the 1920s: though the Soviet Union diplomatically recognised the Republic of China, Joseph Stalin supported cooperation between the Nationalists and the Communists—including pressuring the Nationalist Government to grant the Communists state and military positions in the government. This was continued into the 1930s that fell in line with the Soviet Union's subversion policy of popular fronts to increase communists' influence in governments.

The Soviet Union urged military and cooperation between Communist China and Nationalist China during China's war against Japan. Initially Mao Zedong accepted the demands of the Soviet Union and in 1938 had recognized Chiang Kai-shek as the "leader" of the "Chinese people". In turn, the Soviet Union accepted Mao's tactic of "continuous guerilla warfare" in the countryside that involved a goal of extending the Communist bases, even if it would result in increased tensions with the Nationalists.

After the breakdown of their cooperation with the Nationalists in 1941, the Communists prospered and grew as the war against Japan dragged on, building up their sphere of influence wherever opportunities were presented, mainly through rural mass organizations, administrative, land and tax reform measures favoring poor peasants; while the Nationalists attempted to neutralize the spread of Communist influence by military blockade and fighting the Japanese at the same time.

The Communist Party's position in China was boosted further upon the Soviet invasion of Manchuria in August 1945 against the Japanese puppet state of Manchukuo and the Japanese Kwantung Army in China and Manchuria. Upon the intervention of the Soviet Union against Japan in World War II in 1945, Mao Zedong in April and May 1945 had planned to mobilize 150,000 to 250,000 soldiers from across China to work with forces of the Soviet Union in capturing Manchuria.

== Other Allied states ==
=== Australia ===
Australia was a sovereign Dominion under the Australian monarchy, as per the Statute of Westminster 1931. At the start of the war Australia followed Britain's foreign policies and accordingly declared war against Germany on 3 September 1939. Australian foreign policy became more independent after the Australian Labor Party formed government in October 1941, and Australia separately declared war against Finland, Hungary and Romania on 8 December 1941 and against Japan the next day.

=== Belgium ===
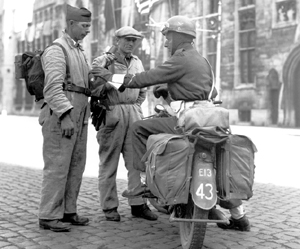
Members of the Belgian Resistance with a Canadian soldier in Bruges, September 1944 during the Battle of the Scheldt

Before the war, Belgium had pursued a policy of neutrality and only became an Allied member after being invaded by Germany on 10 May 1940. During the ensuing fighting, Belgian forces fought alongside French and British forces against the invaders. While the British and French were struggling against the fast German advance elsewhere on the front, the Belgian forces were pushed into a pocket to the north. On 28 May, the King Leopold III surrendered himself and his military to the Germans, having decided the Allied cause was lost.

The legal Belgian government was reformed as a government in exile in London. Belgian troops and pilots continued to fight on the Allied side as the Free Belgian Forces. Belgium itself was occupied, but a sizeable Resistance was formed and was loosely coordinated by the government in exile and other Allied powers.

British and Canadian troops arrived in Belgium in September 1944 and the capital, Brussels, was liberated on 6 September. Because of the Ardennes Offensive, the country was only fully liberated in early 1945.

==== Colonies and dependencies ====
Belgium held the colony of the Belgian Congo and the League of Nations mandate of Ruanda-Urundi. The Belgian Congo was not occupied and remained loyal to the Allies as an important economic asset while its deposits of uranium were useful to the Allied efforts to develop the atomic bomb. Troops from the Belgian Congo participated in the East African Campaign against the Italians. The colonial Force Publique also served in other theatres including Madagascar, the Middle-East, India and Burma within British units.

=== Brazil ===
Initially, Brazil maintained a position of neutrality, trading with both the Allies and the Axis, while Brazilian president Getúlio Vargas's quasi-Fascist policies indicated a leaning toward the Axis powers. However, as the war progressed, trade with the Axis countries became almost impossible and the United States initiated forceful diplomatic and economic efforts to bring Brazil onto the Allied side.

At the beginning of 1942, Brazil permitted the United States to set up air bases on its territory, especially in Natal, strategically located at the easternmost corner of the South American continent, and on 28 January the country severed diplomatic relations with Germany, Japan and Italy. After that, 36 Brazilian merchant ships were sunk by the German and Italian navies, which led the Brazilian government to declare war against Germany and Italy on 22 August 1942.

Brazil then sent a 25,700 strong Expeditionary Force to Europe that fought mainly on the Italian front, from September 1944 to May 1945. Also, the Brazilian Navy and Air Force acted in the Atlantic Ocean from the middle of 1942 until the end of the war. Brazil was the only South American country to send troops to fight in the European theatre in the Second World War.

=== Canada ===
Canada was a sovereign Dominion under the Canadian monarchy, as per the Statute of Westminster 1931. In a symbolic statement of autonomous foreign policy Prime Minister William Lyon Mackenzie King delayed parliament's vote on a declaration of war for seven days after Britain had declared war. Canada was the last member of the Commonwealth to declare war on Germany on 10 September 1939.

=== Cuba ===
Because of Cuba's geographical position at the entrance of the Gulf of Mexico, Havana's role as the principal trading port in the West Indies, and the country's natural resources, Cuba was an important participant in the American Theater of World War II, and subsequently one of the greatest beneficiaries of the United States' Lend-Lease program. Cuba declared war on the Axis powers in December 1941, making it one of the first Latin American countries to enter the conflict, and by the war's end in 1945 its military had developed a reputation as being the most efficient and cooperative of all the Caribbean states. On 15 May 1943, the Cuban patrol boat CS-13 sank the German submarine U-176.

=== Czechoslovakia ===
In 1938, with the Munich Agreement, Czechoslovakia, the United Kingdom, and France sought to resolve German irredentist claims to the Sudetenland region. As a result, the incorporation of the Sudetenland into Germany began on 1 October 1938. Additionally, a small northeastern part of the border region known as Trans-Olza was occupied by and annexed to Poland. Further, by the First Vienna Award, Hungary received southern territories of Slovakia and Carpathian Ruthenia.

A Slovak State was proclaimed on 14 March 1939, and the next day Hungary occupied and annexed the remainder of Carpathian Ruthenia, and the German Wehrmacht moved into the remainder of the Czech Lands. On 16 March 1939 the Protectorate of Bohemia and Moravia was proclaimed after negotiations with Emil Hácha, who remained technically head of state with the title of State President. After a few months, former Czechoslovak President Beneš organized a committee in exile and sought diplomatic recognition as the legitimate government of the First Czechoslovak Republic. The committee's success in obtaining intelligence and coordinating actions by the Czechoslovak resistance led first Britain and then the other Allies to recognize it in 1941. In December 1941 the Czechoslovak government-in-exile declared war on the Axis powers. Czechoslovak military units took part in the war.

=== Dominican Republic ===
The Dominican Republic was one of the very few countries willing to accept mass Jewish immigration during World War II. At the Évian Conference, it offered to accept up to 100,000 Jewish refugees. The DORSA (Dominican Republic Settlement Association) was formed with the assistance of the JDC, and helped settle Jews in Sosúa, on the northern coast. About 700 European Jews of Ashkenazi Jewish descent reached the settlement where each family received 33 hectares (82 acres) of land, 10 cows (plus 2 additional cows per children), a mule and a horse, and a US$10,000 loan (equivalent to about $219,000 in 2025) at 1% interest.

The Dominican Republic officially declared war on the Axis powers on 11 December 1941, after the attack on Pearl Harbor. However, the Caribbean state had already been engaged in war actions since before the formal declaration of war. Dominican sailboats and schooners had been attacked on previous occasions by German submarines as, highlighting the case of the 1,993-ton merchant ship, San Rafael, which was making a trip from Tampa, Florida to Kingston, Jamaica, when 80 miles away from its final destination, it was torpedoed by the German submarine U-125, causing the commander to order the ship abandoned. Although the crew of San Rafael managed to escape the event, it would be remembered by the Dominican press as a sign of the "infamy of the German submarines and the danger they represented in the Caribbean".

Recently, due to a research work carried out by the Embassy of the United States of America in Santo Domingo and the Institute of Dominican Studies of the City of New York (CUNY), documents of the Department of Defense were discovered in which it was confirmed that around 340 men and women of Dominican origin were part of the US Armed Forces during the World War II. Many of them received medals and other recognitions for their outstanding actions in combat.

=== Egypt ===
The Kingdom of Egypt had been nominally an independent state since 1922 but, under the Anglo-Egyptian treaty of 1936, British forces were permitted in Egypt to defend the Suez Canal, the major trade route between the United Kingdom, India and Australia. On 1 September 1939, Britain invoked another clause in the treaty allowing Britain to effectively occupy the country in the event of war. Although Egypt subsequently severed diplomatic relations with Germany, Italy and Vichy France, it remained formally neutral, even after Italy invaded the country on 17 September 1940. Britain considered King Farouk an Axis sympathiser and, in the Abdeen Palace incident of February 1942, forced him to appoint a pro-British government which clamped down on Axis sympathisers. The Allied victory at the Second Battle of El Alamein in November 1942, secured Egypt from the Axis. On 26 February 1945, Egypt declared war on Germany and Japan, and the following day signed the United Nations declaration.

=== Ethiopia ===
The Ethiopian Empire was invaded by Italy on 3 October 1935. On 2 May 1936, Emperor Haile Selassie I fled into exile, just before the Italian occupation on 7 May. After the outbreak of World War II, the Ethiopian government-in-exile cooperated with the British during the British Invasion of Italian East Africa beginning in June 1940. Haile Selassie returned to his rule on 18 January 1941. Ethiopia declared war on Germany, Italy and Japan in December 1942.

=== Greece ===
Greece was invaded by Italy on 28 October 1940 and subsequently joined the Allies. The Greek Army managed to stop the Italian offensive from Italy's protectorate of Albania, and Greek forces pushed Italian forces back into Albania. However, after the German invasion of Greece in April 1941, German forces managed to occupy mainland Greece and, a month later, the island of Crete. The Greek government went into exile, while the country was placed under a puppet government and divided into occupation zones run by Italy, Germany and Bulgaria.

From 1941, a strong resistance movement appeared, chiefly in the mountainous interior, where it established a "Free Greece" by mid-1943. Following the Italian capitulation in September 1943, the Italian zone was taken over by the Germans. Axis forces left mainland Greece in October 1944, although some Aegean islands, notably Crete, remained under German occupation until the end of the war.

=== Luxembourg ===
Before the war, Luxembourg had pursued a policy of neutrality and only became an Allied member after being invaded by Germany on 10 May 1940. The government in exile fled, winding up in England. It made Luxembourgish language broadcasts to the occupied country on BBC Radio. In 1944, the government in exile signed a treaty with the Belgian and Dutch governments, creating the Benelux Economic Union and also signed into the Bretton Woods system.

=== Mexico ===
Mexico declared war on Germany in 1942 after German submarines attacked the Mexican oil tankers Potrero del Llano and Faja de Oro that were transporting crude oil to the United States. These attacks prompted President Manuel Ávila Camacho to declare war on the Axis powers.

Mexico formed the Escuadrón 201 fighter squadron as part of the Fuerza Aérea Expedicionaria Mexicana (FAEM—"Mexican Expeditionary Air Force"). The squadron was attached to the 58th Fighter Group of the United States Army Air Forces and carried out tactical air support missions during the liberation of the main Philippine island of Luzon in the summer of 1945.

Some 300,000 Mexican citizens went to the United States to work on farms and factories. Some 15,000 U.S. nationals of Mexican origin and Mexican residents in the US enrolled in the US Armed Forces and fought in various fronts around the world.

=== Netherlands ===
The Netherlands became an Allied member after being invaded on 10 May 1940 by Germany. During the ensuing campaign, the Netherlands were defeated and occupied by Germany. The Netherlands was liberated by Canadian, British, American and other allied forces during the campaigns of 1944 and 1945. The Princess Irene Brigade, formed from escapees from the German invasion, took part in several actions in 1944 in Arromanches and in 1945 in the Netherlands. Navy vessels saw action in the British Channel, the North Sea and the Mediterranean, generally as part of Royal Navy units. Dutch airmen flying British aircraft participated in the air war over Germany.

==== Colonies and dependencies ====
The Dutch East Indies (modern-day Indonesia) was the principal Dutch colony in Asia, and was seized by Japan in 1942. During the Dutch East Indies Campaign, the Netherlands played a significant role in the Allied effort to halt the Japanese advance as part of the American-British-Dutch-Australian (ABDA) Command. The ABDA fleet finally encountered the Japanese surface fleet at the Battle of Java Sea, at which Doorman gave the order to engage. During the ensuing battle the ABDA fleet suffered heavy losses, and was mostly destroyed after several naval battles around Java; the ABDA Command was later dissolved. The Japanese finally occupied the Dutch East Indies in February–March 1942. Dutch troops, aircraft and escaped ships continued to fight on the Allied side and also mounted a guerrilla campaign in Timor.

=== New Zealand ===
New Zealand was a sovereign Dominion under the New Zealand monarchy, as per the Statute of Westminster 1931. It quickly entered World War II, officially declaring war on Germany on 3 September 1939, just hours after Britain. Unlike Australia, which had felt obligated to declare war, as it also had not ratified the Statute of Westminster, New Zealand did so as a sign of allegiance to Britain, and in recognition of Britain's abandonment of its former appeasement policy, which New Zealand had long opposed. This led to then Prime Minister Michael Joseph Savage declaring two days later:

With gratitude for the past and confidence in the future we range ourselves without fear beside Britain. Where she goes, we go; where she stands, we stand. We are only a small and young nation, but we march with a union of hearts and souls to a common destiny.

=== Norway ===
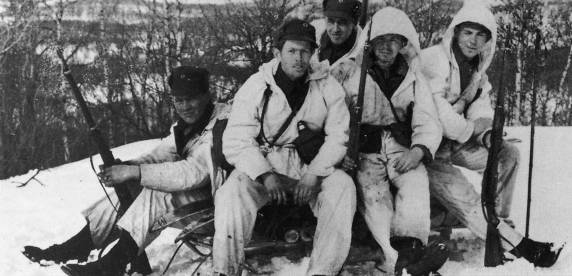
Norwegian soldiers on the Narvik front, May 1940

Because of its strategic location for control of the sea lanes in the North Sea and the Atlantic, both the Allies and Germany worried about the other side gaining control of the neutral country. Germany ultimately struck first with Operation Weserübung on 9 April 1940, resulting in the two-month-long Norwegian Campaign, which ended in a German victory and their war-long occupation of Norway.

Units of the Norwegian Armed Forces evacuated from Norway or raised abroad continued participating in the war from exile.

The Norwegian merchant fleet, then the fourth largest in the world, was organized into Nortraship to support the Allied cause. Nortraship was the world's largest shipping company, and at its height operated more than 1000 ships.

Norway was neutral when Germany invaded, and it is not clear when Norway became an Allied country. Great Britain, France and Polish forces in exile supported Norwegian forces against the invaders but without a specific agreement. Norway's cabinet signed a military agreement with Britain on 28 May 1941. This agreement allowed all Norwegian forces in exile to operate under British command. Norwegian troops in exile should primarily be prepared for the liberation of Norway, but could also be used to defend Britain. At the end of the war German forces in Norway surrendered to British officers on 8 May and allied troops occupied Norway until 7 June.

=== Poland ===
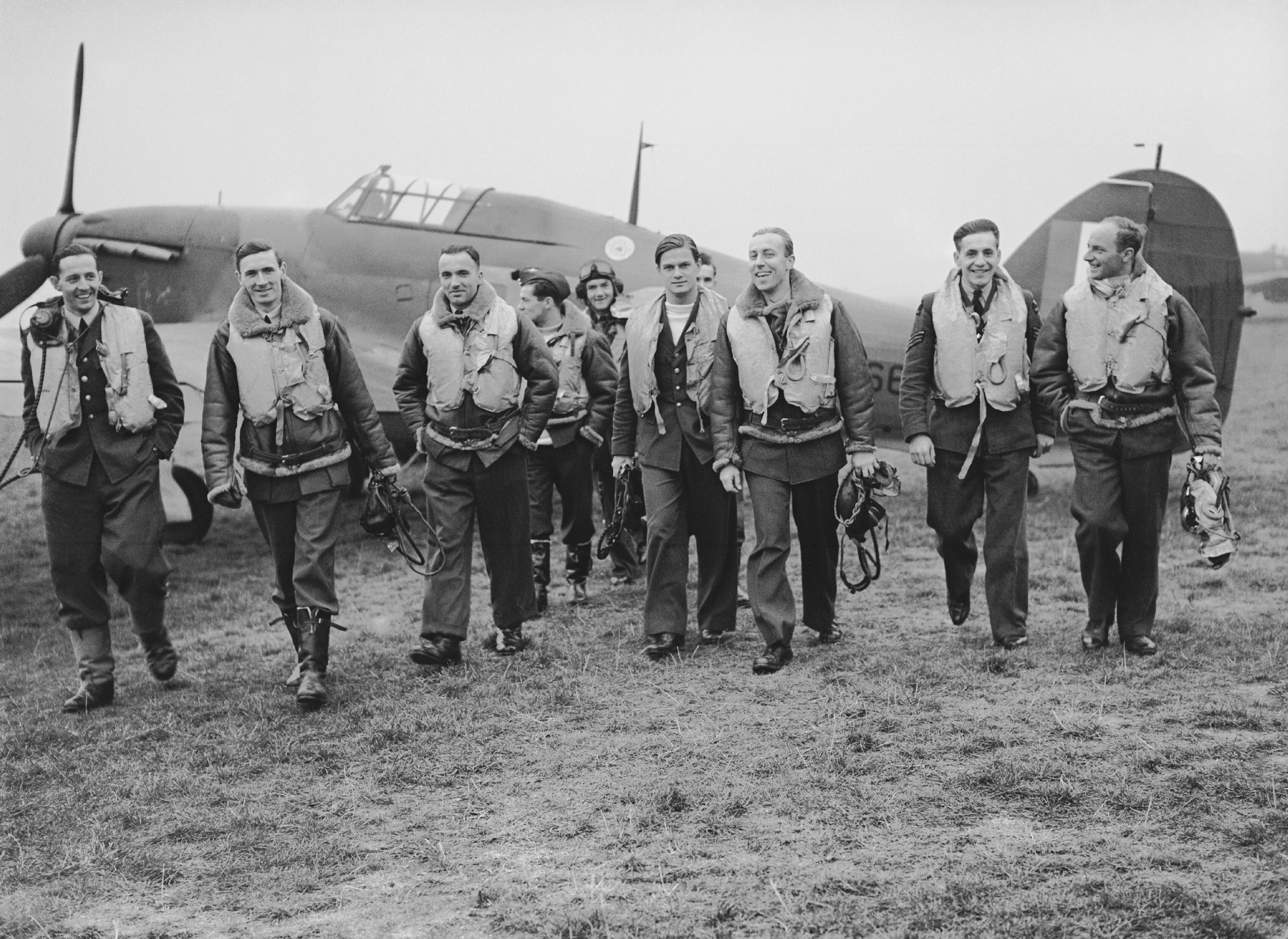
Pilots of the No. 303 "Kościuszko" Polish Fighter Squadron during the Battle of Britain

The Invasion of Poland on 1 September 1939, started the war in Europe, and the United Kingdom and France declared war on Germany on 3 September. Poland fielded the third biggest army among the European Allies, after the Soviet Union and United Kingdom, but before France.

Polish Army suffered a series of defeats in the first days of the invasion. The Soviet Union unilaterally considered the flight to Romania of President Ignacy Mościcki and Marshal Edward Rydz-Śmigły on 17 September as evidence of debellatio causing the extinction of the Polish state, and consequently declared itself allowed to invade Poland starting from the same day. However, the Red Army had invaded the Second Polish Republic several hours before the Polish president fled to Romania. The Soviets invaded on 17 September at 3 a.m., while president Mościcki crossed the Polish-Romanian border at 21:45 on the same day.

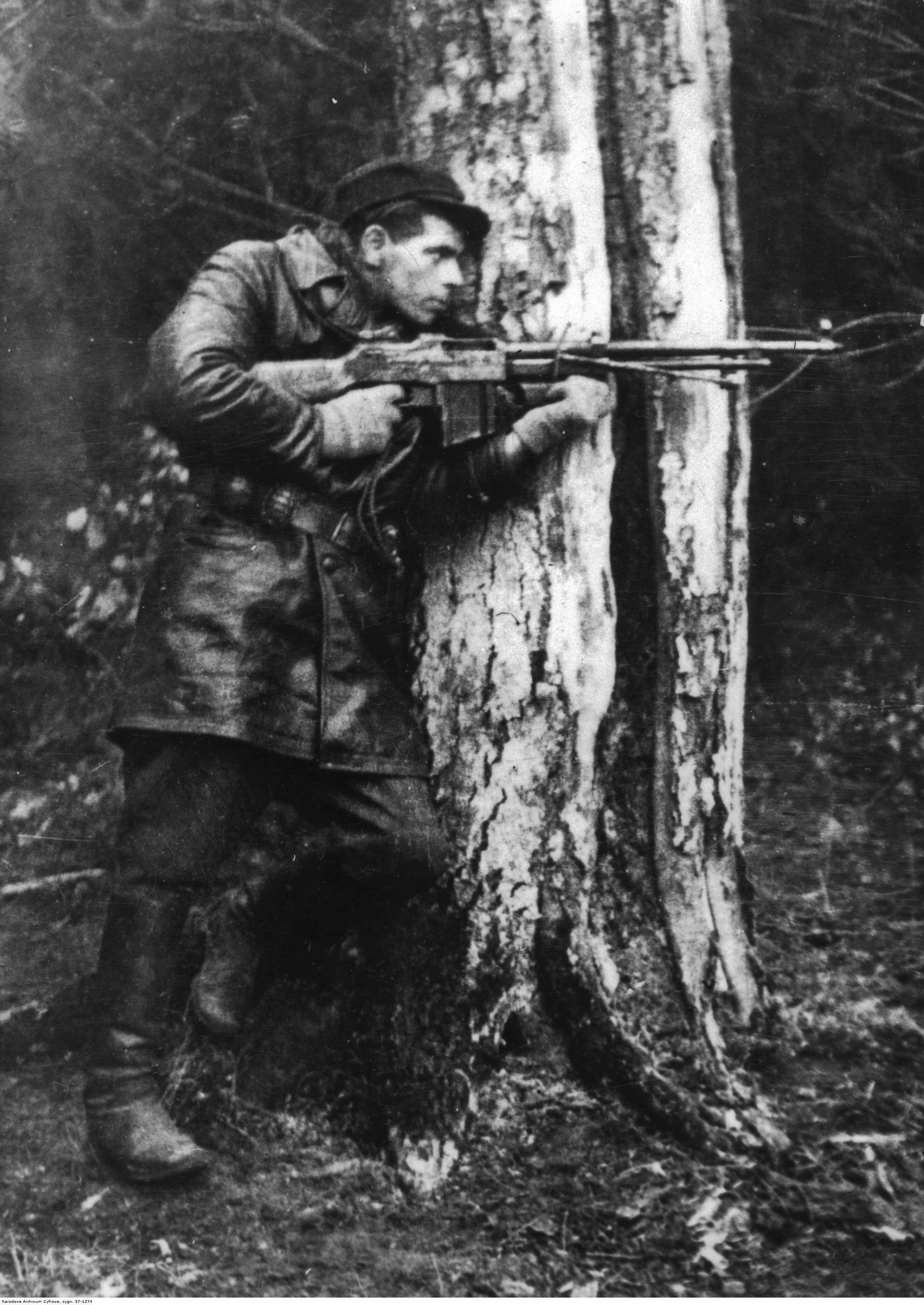
Polish partisan of the Home Army (AK), "Jędrusie" unit, holding a Browning wz.1928 light machine gun

The formation of the Polish armed forces in France began as early as September 1939. By June 1940, their numbers had reached 85,000 soldiers. These forces took part in the Norwegian campaign and the Battle of France. After the defeat of France, the reconstitution of the Polish army had to start from scratch. Polish pilots played a key role in the Battle of Britain, separate Polish units took part in the North African Campaign. After the conclusion of the Polish-Soviet agreement on 30 July 1941, the formation of the Polish army in the Soviet Union (II Corps) also began. The II Corps, numbering 83,000 along with civilians, began to be evacuated from the Soviet Union in mid-1942. It later took part in the fighting in Italy.

After breaking off relations with the Polish government, the Soviet Union began forming its own Polish communist government and its armed forces in mid-1943, from which the 1st Polish Army, under Zygmunt Berling, was formed on 16 March 1944. That army was fighting on the eastern front, alongside the Soviet forces, including the Battle of Berlin, the closing battle of the European theater of war.

The Home Army, loyal to the London-based government and the largest underground force in Europe, as well other smaller resistance organizations in occupied Poland provided intelligence to the Allies and led to uncovering of Nazi war crimes (i.e., death camps).

=== Saudi Arabia ===
Saudi Arabia severed diplomatic contacts with Germany on 11 September 1939, and with Japan in October 1941. The Saudis provided the Allies with large supplies of oil. Diplomatic relations with the United States were established in 1943. King Abdul Aziz Al-Saud was a personal friend of Franklin D. Roosevelt. The Americans were then allowed to build an air force base near Dhahran. Saudi Arabia declared war on Germany and Japan in 1945.

=== South Africa ===
South Africa was a sovereign Dominion under the South African monarchy, as per the Statute of Westminster 1931. South Africa held authority over the mandate of South-West Africa. Due to significant pro-German feeling and the presence of fascist sympathizers within the Afrikaner nationalist movement (such as the Grey Shirts and the Ossewabrandwag), South Africa's entry into the war was politically divisive. Initially the government of J. B. M. Hertzog tried to maintain official neutrality after the outbreak of war. This caused a revolt by the governing United Party caucus which voted against Hertzog's position on the war and resulted in Hertzog's coalition partner, Jan Smuts, forming a new government and becoming prime minister. Smuts was then able to lead the country into war on the side of the Allies.

Around 334,000 South Africans volunteered to fight in the war with 11,023 recorded wartime deaths.

=== Yugoslavia ===
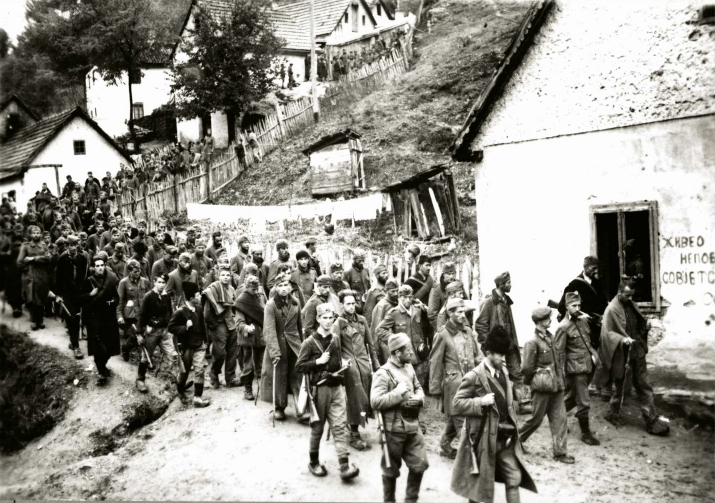
Partisans and Chetniks escorting captured Germans through Užice, autumn 1941

Yugoslavia entered the war on the Allied side after the invasion of Axis powers on 6 April 1941. The Royal Yugoslav Army was thoroughly defeated in less than two weeks and the country was occupied starting on 18 April. The Italian-backed Croatian fascist leader Ante Pavelić declared the Independent State of Croatia before the invasion was over. King Peter II and much of the Yugoslavian government had left the country. In the United Kingdom, they joined numerous other governments in exile from Nazi-occupied Europe. Beginning with the uprising in Herzegovina in June 1941, there was continuous anti-Axis resistance in Yugoslavia until the end of the war.

==== Resistance factions ====
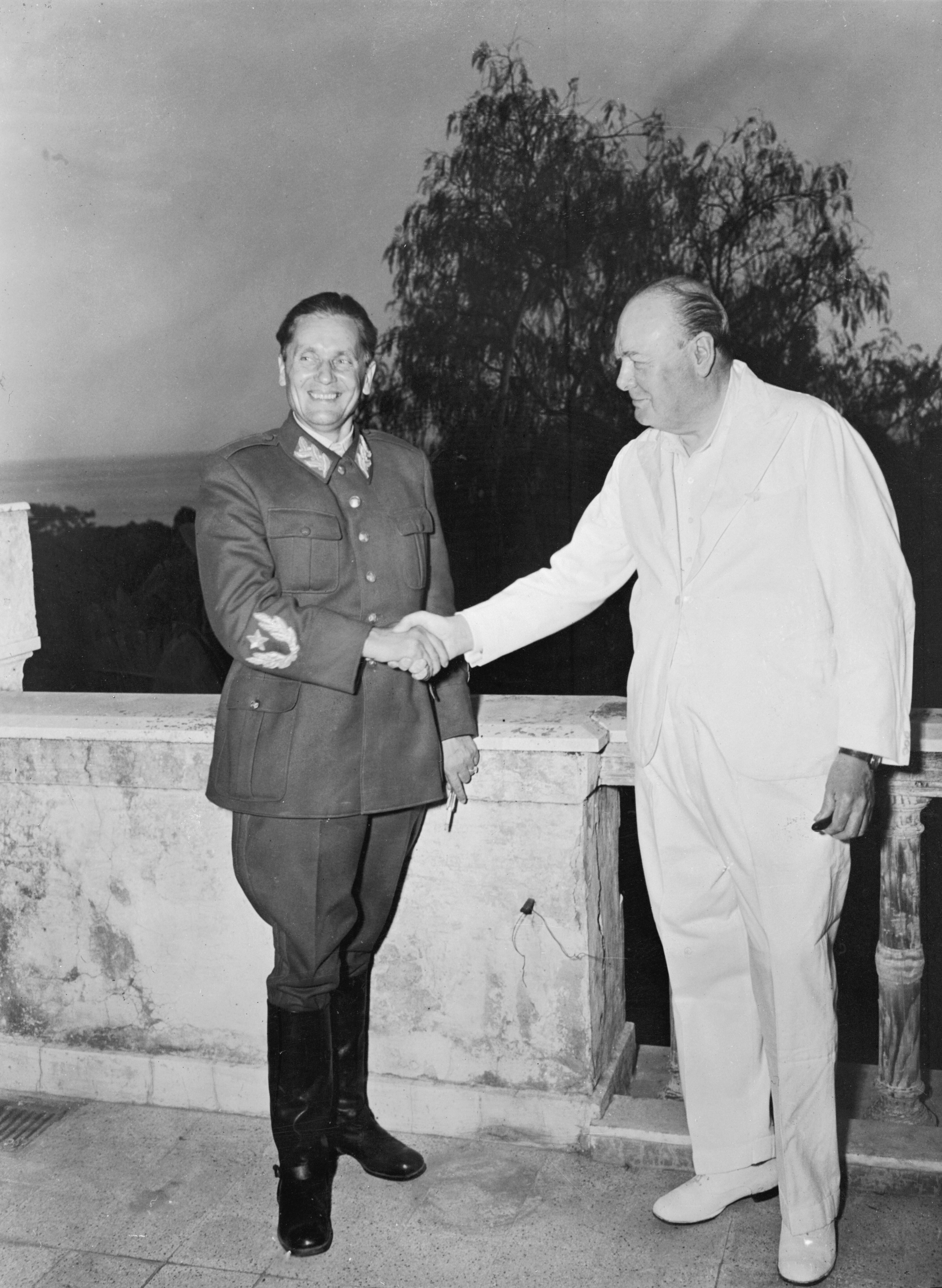
Partisan leader Marshal Josip Broz Tito with Winston Churchill in 1944

Before the end of 1941, the anti-Axis resistance movement split between the royalist Chetniks and the communist Yugoslav Partisans of Josip Broz Tito who fought both against each other during the war and against the occupying forces. The Yugoslav Partisans managed to put up considerable resistance to the Axis occupation, forming various liberated territories during the war. In August 1943, there were over 30 Axis divisions on the territory of Yugoslavia, not including the forces of the Croatian puppet state and other quisling formations. In 1944, the leading Allied powers persuaded Tito's Yugoslav Partisans and the royalist Yugoslav government led by Prime Minister Ivan Šubašić to sign the Treaty of Vis that created the Democratic Federal Yugoslavia.

===== Partisans =====
The Partisans were a major Yugoslav resistance movement against the Axis occupation and partition of Yugoslavia. Initially, the Partisans were in rivalry with the Chetniks over control of the resistance movement. However, the Partisans were recognized by both the Eastern and Western Allies as the primary resistance movement in 1943. After that, their strength increased rapidly, from 100,000 at the beginning of 1943 to over 648,000 in September 1944. In 1945 they were transformed into the Yugoslav army, organized in four field armies with 800,000 fighters.

===== Chetniks =====
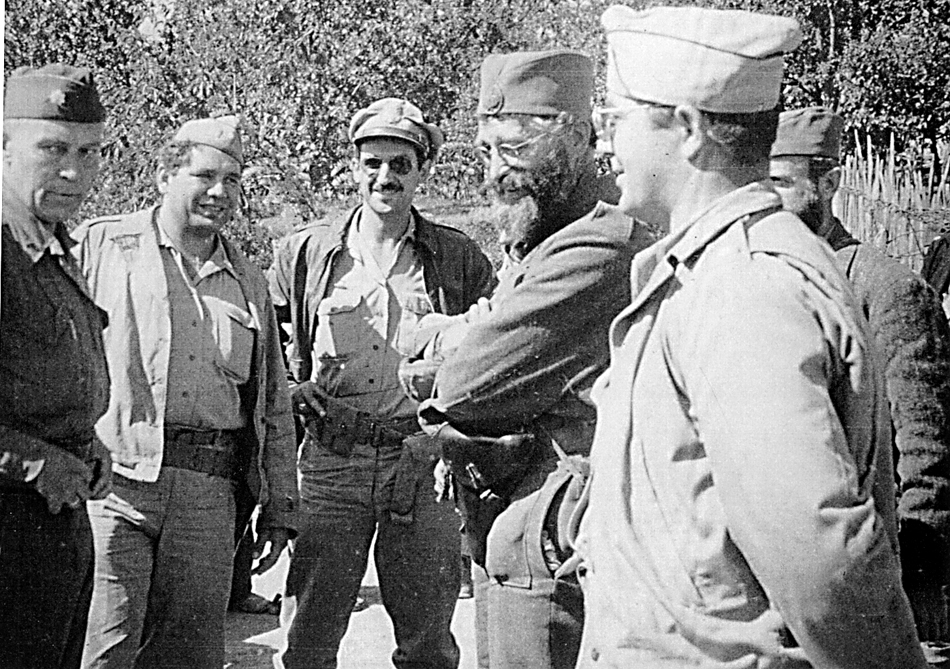
Chetniks leader General Mihailovic with members of the U.S. military mission, Operation Halyard, 1944

The Chetniks, the short name given to the movement titled the Yugoslav Army of the Fatherland, were initially a major Allied Yugoslav resistance movement. However, due to their royalist and anti-communist views, Chetniks were considered to have begun collaborating with the Axis as a tactical move to focus on destroying their Partisan rivals. The Chetniks presented themselves as a Yugoslav movement, but were primarily a Serb movement. They reached their peak in 1943 with 93,000 fighters. Their major contribution was Operation Halyard in 1944. In collaboration with the OSS, 413 Allied airmen shot down over Yugoslavia were rescued and evacuated.

== Associated powers and other states fighting Axis ==
The Paris peace treaties of 1947 distinguished between "Associated Powers" of the Allies, and enemy states that had switched sides and become "co-belligerents" of the Allies or otherwise "took an active part in the war against Germany."

=== Albania ===
Italy invaded Albania on 7 April 1939 and annexed the country. King Zog of Albania fled to London, but Britain recognized the Italian annexation. Various resistance groups emerged in Albania including the Balli Kombëtar (National Front) and partisans led by the Communist Party. Following Italy's withdrawal from the Axis in September 1943, Germany invaded Albania and installed a new collaborationist government. In October 1944, Germany began evacuating Albania, harried by the partisans who, supplied by the Allies, were now the dominant resistance army. Tirana fell to the partisans on 28 November 1944 and the Communist-dominated National Liberation Movement took control of the country. Albania was recognized as an "Associated Power" of the Allies in the peace treaty with Italy of February 1947.

=== Bulgaria ===
Bulgaria signed the Tripartite Pact on 1 March 1941, and on 13 December declared war on the United Kingdom and the United States. Bulgaria did not declare war on the Soviet Union, but as the Soviet army advanced to its border in 1944, it submitted to Soviet pressure and declared war on Germany on 8 September. A new Bulgarian government, dominated by communists, committed over 300,000 troops to the war against Germany. These troops fought alongside Soviet forces in the Balkans, Hungary and Austria. Bulgaria remained technically at war with the Allies until the ratification of its treaty of February 1947 with them.

=== Finland ===
Finland was invaded by the Soviet Union on 30 November 1939 and forced to cede territory in the subsequent peace treaty of 12 March 1940. On 26 June 1941, Finland joined Germany in its invasion of the Soviet Union, leading to the United Kingdom declaring war on Finland on 5 December. Finland sought peace when Soviet troops entered the country in 1944. The Soviet Union demanded that Finland break off relations with Germany and expel or disarm German troops in Finland as preconditions for an armistice. Finland severed relations with Germany on 3 September 1944, and signed the Moscow Armistice with the Soviet Union on 19 September. Under pressure from the Soviet Union, Finland escalated skirmishing with the German troops evacuating Finland into warfare in the Lapland region by 2 October. Finland's war against Germany ended when the last German soldiers left Finland for Norway in April 1945. Finland, however, was not recognised as an allied power. It remained technically at war with the Soviet Union and United Kingdom until ratification of its 1947 peace treaty with them.

=== Italy ===
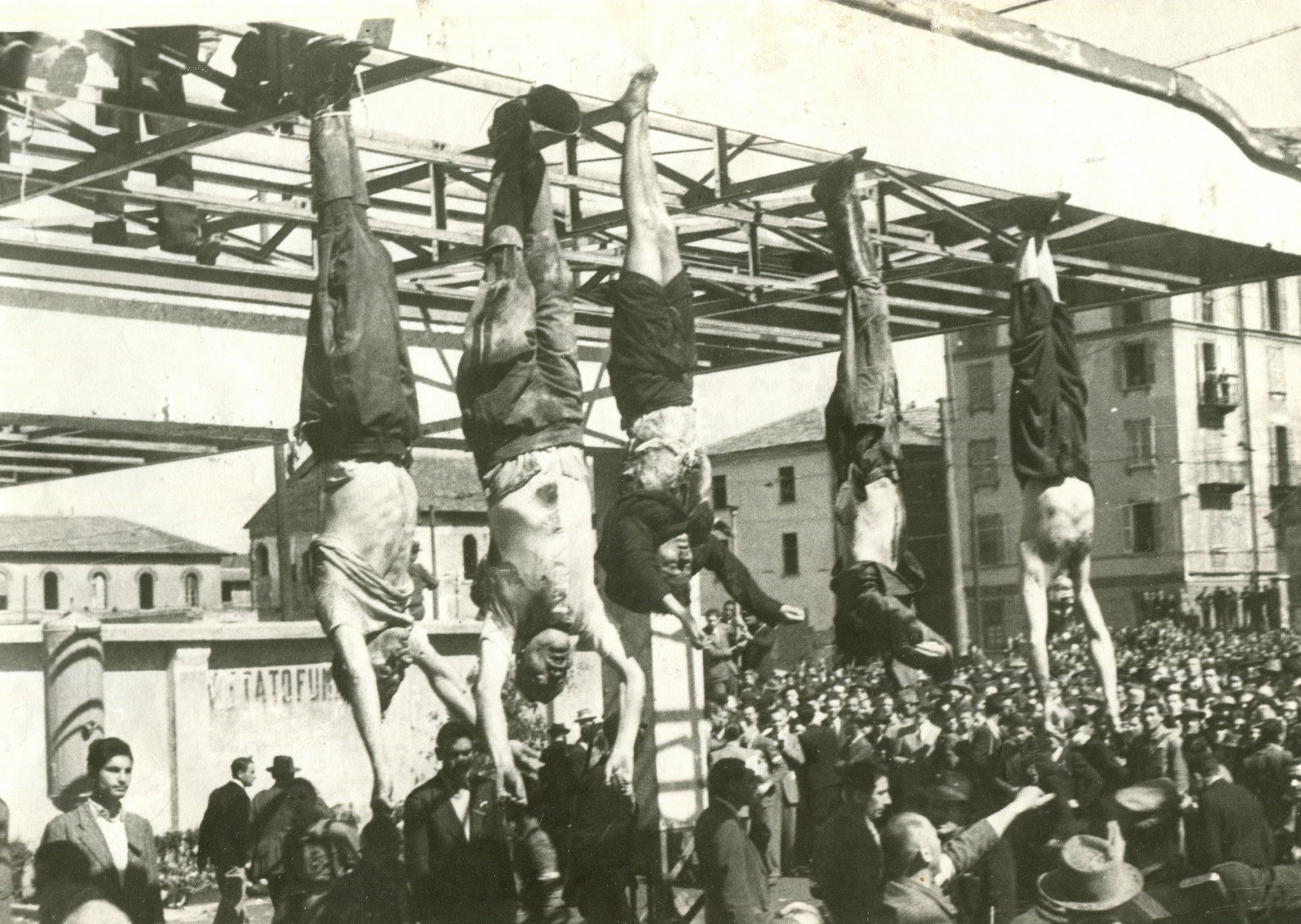
The dead bodies of Benito Mussolini, his mistress Clara Petacci, and several Fascist leaders, hanging for public display after they were executed by Italian partisans in 1945

Italy entered the war as an Axis power on 10 June 1940. Following the Allied invasion of Sicily, Italy's fascist leader Benito Mussolini was deposed on 25 July 1943, and the Italian king, Victor Emmanuel III, appointed Pietro Badoglio prime minister. The new government signed an armistice on 3 September 1943 ending Italy's war against the Allies. The Italian government moved to the south of the country and declared war on Germany on 13 October, becoming a co-belligerent of the Allies. The Italian Co-Belligerent Army participated in the Allied campaign against German forces in Italy and Mussolini's Italian Social Republic in the north of the country. The co-belligerent army's participation in the fighting was initially limited until, in January 1945, four divisions were deployed on the frontline from Bologna to the Adriatic. Italy remained technically at war with the Allies until ratification of its 1947 peace treaty with the Allied and Associated Powers.

=== Romania ===
Initially neutral in the war, Romania joined the Axis powers when it signed the Tripartite Pact on 23 November 1940. It joined the German invasion of the Soviet Union on 22 June 1941, leading to the United Kingdom declaring war on Romania on 7 December. Romania declared war on the United States on 12 December. As the war turned against the Axis powers, King Michael of Romania deposed the government of Ion Antonescu on 23 August 1944, and Romania entered the war against Germany and Hungary. Romania signed an armistice with the Allies on 12 September under which it was required to deploy 12 infantry divisions against the remaining Axis powers. Romania eventually deployed 16 to 20 divisions, assisting the Soviet Union in driving Axis forces from Romania, Hungary and Czechoslovakia. The Romanian army was the fourth largest engaged against Axis forces in Europe at that time. The Soviet Union compelled the Romanian government of Petru Groza to demobilise its forces in March 1945, and Romania remained formally at war with the Allies until the ratification of its 1947 peace treaty with them.

== Legacy ==
=== Charter of the United Nations ===
The Declaration by United Nations on 1 January 1942, signed by the Four Policemen – the United States, United Kingdom, Soviet Union and China – and 22 other countries laid the groundwork for the future of the United Nations.

At the Potsdam Conference of July – August 1945, Roosevelt's successor, Harry S. Truman, proposed that the foreign ministers of China, France, the Soviet Union, the United Kingdom, and the United States "should draft the peace treaties and boundary settlements of Europe", which led to the creation of the Council of Foreign Ministers of the "Big Five", and soon thereafter the establishment of those states as the permanent members of the UNSC.

The Charter of the United Nations was agreed to during the war at the United Nations Conference on International Organization, held between April and July 1945. The Charter was signed by 50 states on 26 June (Poland had its place reserved and later became the 51st "original" signatory), and was formally ratified shortly after the war on 24 October 1945. In 1944, the United Nations was formulated and negotiated among the delegations from the Soviet Union, the United Kingdom, the United States and China at the Dumbarton Oaks Conference where the formation and the permanent seats (for the "Big Five", China, France, the United Kingdom, US, and Soviet Union) of the United Nations Security Council were decided. The Security Council met for the first time in the immediate aftermath of war on 17 January 1946.

These are the original 51 signatories (UNSC permanent members are asterisked):

- (Argentina) Argentine Republic
- Commonwealth of Australia
- Kingdom of Belgium
- Republic of Bolivia
- (Vargas Era) United States of Brazil
- Byelorussian Soviet Socialist Republic
- Dominion of Canada
- Republic of Chile
- (Republic of China (1912–1949)) Republic of China*
- Republic of Colombia
- Republic of Costa Rica
- Republic of Cuba
- (Czechoslovakia) Czechoslovak Republic
- Kingdom of Denmark
- Dominican Republic
- Republic of Ecuador
- Kingdom of Egypt
- Republic of El Salvador
- Ethiopian Empire
- (Provisional Government of the French Republic) French Republic*
- Kingdom of Greece
- Republic of Guatemala
- Republic of Haiti
- Republic of Honduras
- (British Raj) India
- (Pahlavi Iran) Imperial State of Iran
- Kingdom of Iraq
- (Lebanon) Lebanese Republic
- Republic of Liberia
- Grand Duchy of Luxembourg
- (Mexico) United Mexican States
- Kingdom of the Netherlands
- Dominion of New Zealand
- Republic of Nicaragua
- Kingdom of Norway
- Republic of Panama
- Republic of Paraguay
- Republic of Peru
- Commonwealth of the Philippines
- (Provisional Government of National Unity) Republic of Poland
- Kingdom of Saudi Arabia
- Union of South Africa
- (Syria) Syrian Republic
- Republic of Turkey
- Ukrainian Soviet Socialist Republic
- (Soviet Union) Union of Soviet Socialist Republics*
- United Kingdom of Great Britain and Northern Ireland*
- United States of America*
- Oriental Republic of Uruguay
- United States of Venezuela
- Democratic Federal Yugoslavia

=== Cold War ===
Despite the successful creation of the United Nations, the alliance of the Soviet Union with the United States and with the United Kingdom ultimately broke down and evolved into the Cold War, which took place over the following half-century.

== Summary ==
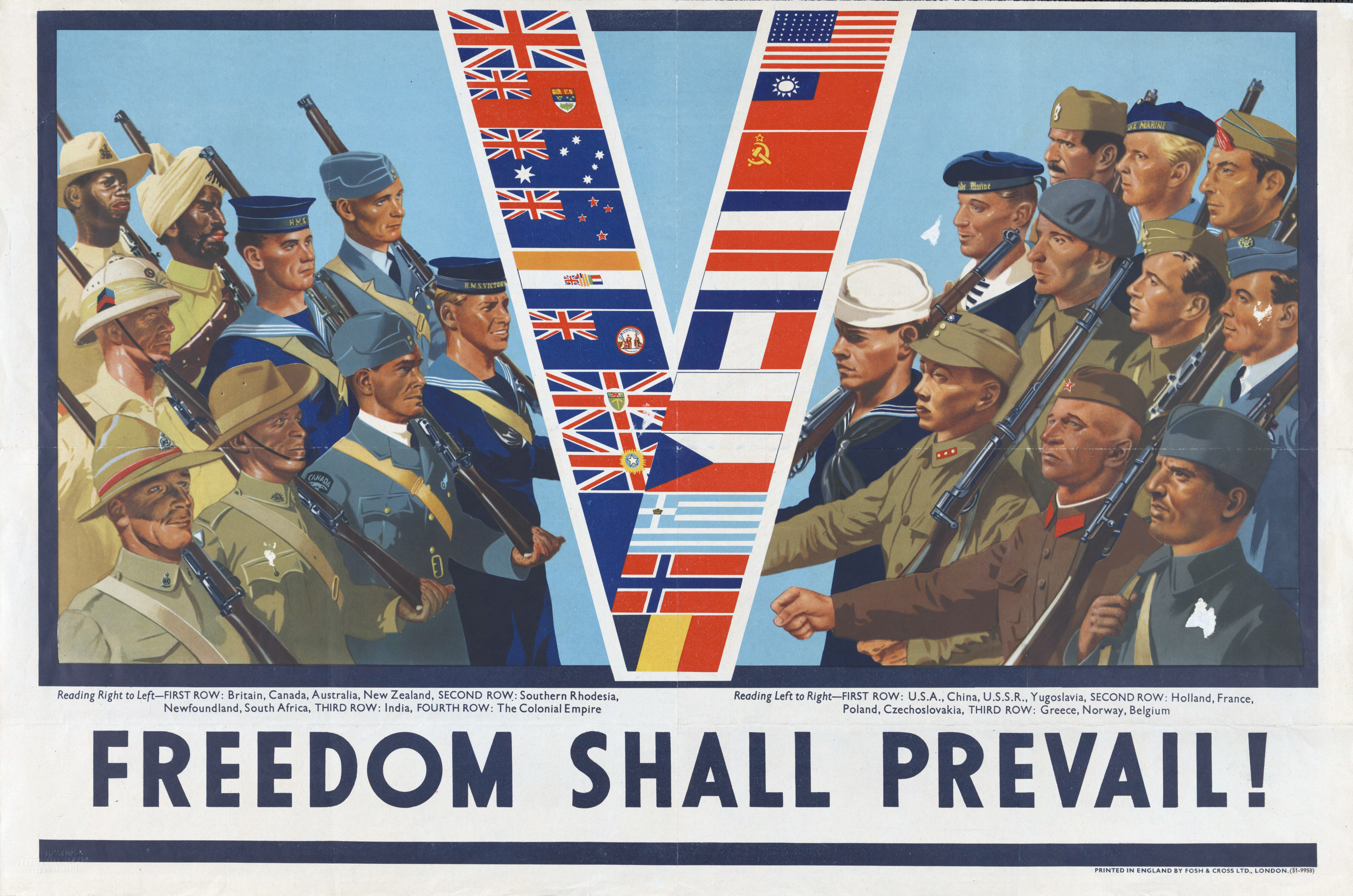
Poster with V for Victory

The Big Four:

- United Kingdom (from 3 September 1939)
  - India
  - Australia
  - New Zealand
  - South Africa
  - Canada (from 10 September 1939)
- Soviet Union (from 22 June 1941)
- United States (from 7 December 1941)
- China (Note: China had been in an undeclared war with Japan since 18 September 1931. It declared war on Japan, Germany and Italy on 9 December 1941 and joined the Allies in December 1941 after the attacks on Pearl Harbor.) (from 9 December 1941)

Allied combatant states and allied governments in exile:

- Free France (Note: France declared war on Germany on 3 September 1939, two days after the German invasion of Poland. It was a member of the Allies until its defeat in the German invasion of France in June 1940. Unlike the other governments-in-exile in London, which were legitimate governments that had escaped their respective countries and continued the fight, France had surrendered to the Axis. The "Free French Forces" were a section of the French army which refused to recognize the armistice and continued to fight with the Allies. They worked towards France being seen and treated as a major allied power, as opposed to a defeated and then liberated nation. They struggled with legitimacy vis-a-vis the German client state "Vichy France", which was the internationally recognized government of France even among the Allies. A National Liberation Committee was formed by the Free French after the gradual liberation of Vichy colonial territory, which led to the full German occupation of Vichy France in 1942. This started a shift in Allied policy from trying to improve relations with the Vichy regime into full support to what was now the Provisional Government of the French Republic.)
- Poland (Note: Poland was allied with the United Kingdom and France, and was attacked by Germany and the Soviet Union in 1939. The government-in-exile continued to fight alongside the Western Allies. It also signed the alliance with the Soviet Union on 30 July 1941, which was broken by the Soviets on 25 April 1943. Subsequently, the puppet, created in Moscow, Union of Polish Patriots fought against Germany and Polish Underground State alongside the Soviets.)
- Czechoslovakia (Note: Edvard Beneš, president of the First Czechoslovak Republic, fled the country after the 1938 Munich Agreement saw the Sudetenland region annexed by Germany. In 1939 a German sponsored Slovak Republic seceded from the post-Munich Second Czechoslovak Republic, providing justification for the establishment of a German protectorate over the remaining Czech lands (the rump Carpathian Ruthenia region being annexed by Hungary). Following the outbreak of war later the same year, Beneš, in his exile, formed a Czechoslovak National Liberation Committee which after some months of negotiations regarding its legitimacy became regarded as the Czechoslovak government-in-exile by the Allies.)
- Belgium
- Luxembourg
- Netherlands
- Norway
- Greece
- Yugoslavia
- Ethiopian Empire (Note: The Ethiopian Empire was invaded by Italy on 3 October 1935. On 2 May 1936, Emperor Haile Selassie I fled into exile, just before the Italian occupation on 7 May. After the outbreak of World War II, the United Kingdom recognized Haile Selassie as the Emperor of Ethiopia in July 1940 and his Ethiopian exile government cooperated with the British during their invasion of Italian East Africa in 1941. Through the invasion Haile Selassie returned to Ethiopia on 18 January, with the liberation of the country being completed by November the same year.)
- Philippines

Minor sovereign Allied combatant states:

- Mexico
- (Estado Novo (Brazil)) Brazil

Associated powers of the Allies:

- Nepal
- Albania (from 20 October 1944)

Co-belligerent states fighting the Axis:

- Italy (from 8 September 1943)
- Romania (from 25 August 1944)
- Bulgaria (from 5 September 1944)
- Finland (from 15 September 1944)
- Hungary (from 30 December 1944)

Allies of World War II – Declaration by United Nations and at the San Francisco Conference
Country	Declaration by United Nations	Declared war on the Axis	San Francisco Conference
Argentina	No	Yes 1945	Yes
Australia	Yes 1942	Yes 1939/40/42	Yes
(Belgian government in exile) Belgium	Yes 1942	Yes 1941	Yes
Bolivia	Yes 1943	Yes 1943	Yes
(Estado Novo (Brazil)) Brazil	Yes 1943	Yes 1942	Yes
Canada	Yes 1942	Yes 1939/40/41	Yes
Chile	Yes 1945	Yes 1945	Yes
(Republic of China (1912–1949)) China	Yes 1942	Yes 1941	Yes
Colombia	Yes 1943	Yes 1943	Yes
Costa Rica	Yes 1942	Yes 1941	Yes
(Republic of Cuba (1902–1959)) Cuba	Yes 1942	Yes 1941	Yes
(Czechoslovak government-in-exile) Czechoslovakia	Yes 1942	Yes 1941	Yes
Dominican Republic	Yes 1942	Yes 1941	Yes
Ecuador	Yes 1945	Yes 1945	Yes
(Kingdom of Egypt) Egypt	Yes 1945	Yes 1945	Yes
El Salvador	Yes 1942	Yes 1941	Yes
(Ethiopian Empire) Ethiopia	Yes 1942	Yes 1942	Yes
(Provisional Government of the French Republic) France	Yes 1944	Yes 1939/40/41/44	Yes
(Kingdom of Greece) Greece	Yes 1942		Yes
Guatemala	Yes 1942	Yes 1941	Yes
Haiti	Yes 1942	Yes 1941	Yes
Honduras	Yes 1942	Yes 1941	Yes
(British Raj) India (UK-appointed administration, 1858–1947)	Yes 1942	Yes 1939	Yes
(Pahlavi Iran) Iran	Yes 1943	Yes 1943	Yes
(Kingdom of Iraq) Iraq	Yes 1943		Yes
Lebanon	Yes 1945	Yes 1945	Yes
Liberia	Yes 1944	Yes 1943	Yes
(Luxembourg government in exile) Luxembourg	Yes 1942		Yes
Mexico	Yes 1942	Yes 1942	Yes
(Dutch government-in-exile) Netherlands	Yes 1942		Yes
(Dominion of New Zealand) New Zealand	Yes 1942	Yes 1939/40/42	Yes
Nicaragua	Yes 1942	Yes 1941	Yes
Norway	Yes 1942		Yes
Panama	Yes 1942	Yes 1941	Yes
Paraguay	Yes 1945	Yes 1945	Yes
Peru	Yes 1945	Yes 1945	Yes
Philippines	Yes 1942	Yes 1941	Yes
(Polish government-in-exile) Poland	Yes 1942	Yes 1941	No
Saudi Arabia	Yes 1945	Yes 1945	Yes
(Union of South Africa) South Africa	Yes 1942	Yes 1939/40/41/42	Yes
Soviet Union	Yes 1942		Yes
Syria	Yes 1945	Yes 1945	Yes
Turkey	Yes 1945	Yes 1945	Yes
United Kingdom	Yes 1942	Yes 1939/41/42	Yes
United States	Yes 1942	Yes 1941/42	Yes
Uruguay	Yes 1945	Yes 1945	Yes
Venezuela	Yes 1945	Yes 1945	Yes
(Kingdom of Yugoslavia) Yugoslavia	Yes 1942		Yes

== Timeline of Allied states entering the war ==
The following list denotes dates on which states declared war on the Axis powers, or on which an Axis power declared war on them.

=== 1939 ===
- (Second Polish Republic) Poland: 1 September 1939
- (French Third Republic) France: 3 September 1939
  - French Equatorial Africa: 27 October 1940
  - French Cameroon: 27 August 1940
- United Kingdom: 3 September 1939
  - (British Raj) India: 3 September 1939
- Australia: 3 September 1939
- (Dominion of New Zealand) New Zealand: 3 September 1939
- Nepal: 4 September 1939
- (Union of South Africa) South Africa: 6 September 1939
- Canada: 10 September 1939
- Muscat and Oman: 10 September 1939

=== 1940 ===
- Norway: 8 April 1940
- Denmark 9 April 1940 – German invasion without declaration of war
- Belgium: 10 May 1940
- Luxembourg: 10 May 1940
- Netherlands: 10 May 1940
- (Kingdom of Greece) Greece: 28 October 1940

=== 1941 ===
- (Kingdom of Yugoslavia) Yugoslavia: 6 April 1941 (Yugoslavia signed the Tripartite Pact, becoming a nominal member of the Axis on 25 March. The signing of the pact was met with coup d'état on 27 March by pro-western forces which led to an invasion by the Axis on 6 April 1941.)

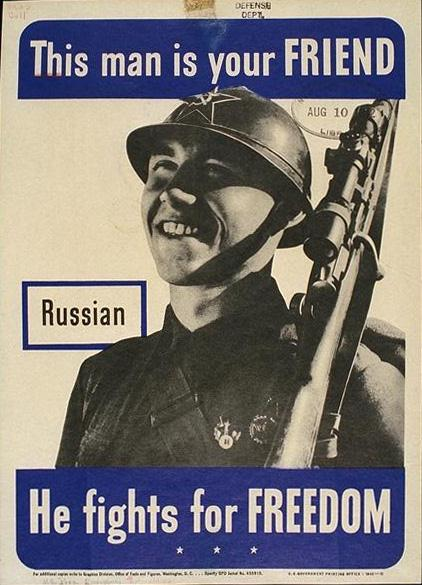
U.S. government poster showing a friendly Soviet soldier, 1942

- Soviet Union: 22 June 1941; Despite membership of the Soviet Union, Ukraine and Belarus were recognized as separate fighting states by the United Kingdom and the United States at the end of the war.
- Panama: 7 December 1941
- United States: 8 December 1941 (war declared on Japan after the Pearl Harbor attack)
  - Philippines: 8 December 1941
- (First Costa Rican Republic) Costa Rica: 8 December 1941
- Dominican Republic: 8 December 1941
- El Salvador: 8 December 1941
- Haiti: 8 December 1941
- Honduras: 8 December 1941
- Nicaragua: 8 December 1941
- (Republic of China (1912–1949)) China: 9 December 1941 (at war with Japan since 1937)
- (Republic of Cuba (1902–1959)) Cuba: 9 December 1941
- Guatemala: 9 December 1941
- United States: 11 December 1941 (war declared on the U.S. by Germany and Italy)

Provisional governments or governments-in exile that declared war against the Axis

- Korea (government in exile): 10 December 1941
- Czechoslovakia (government-in-exile): 16 December 1941

=== 1942 ===
- Mexico: 22 May 1942
- (Vargas Era) Brazil: 22 August 1942
- (Ethiopian Empire) Ethiopia: 14 December 1942

=== 1943 ===
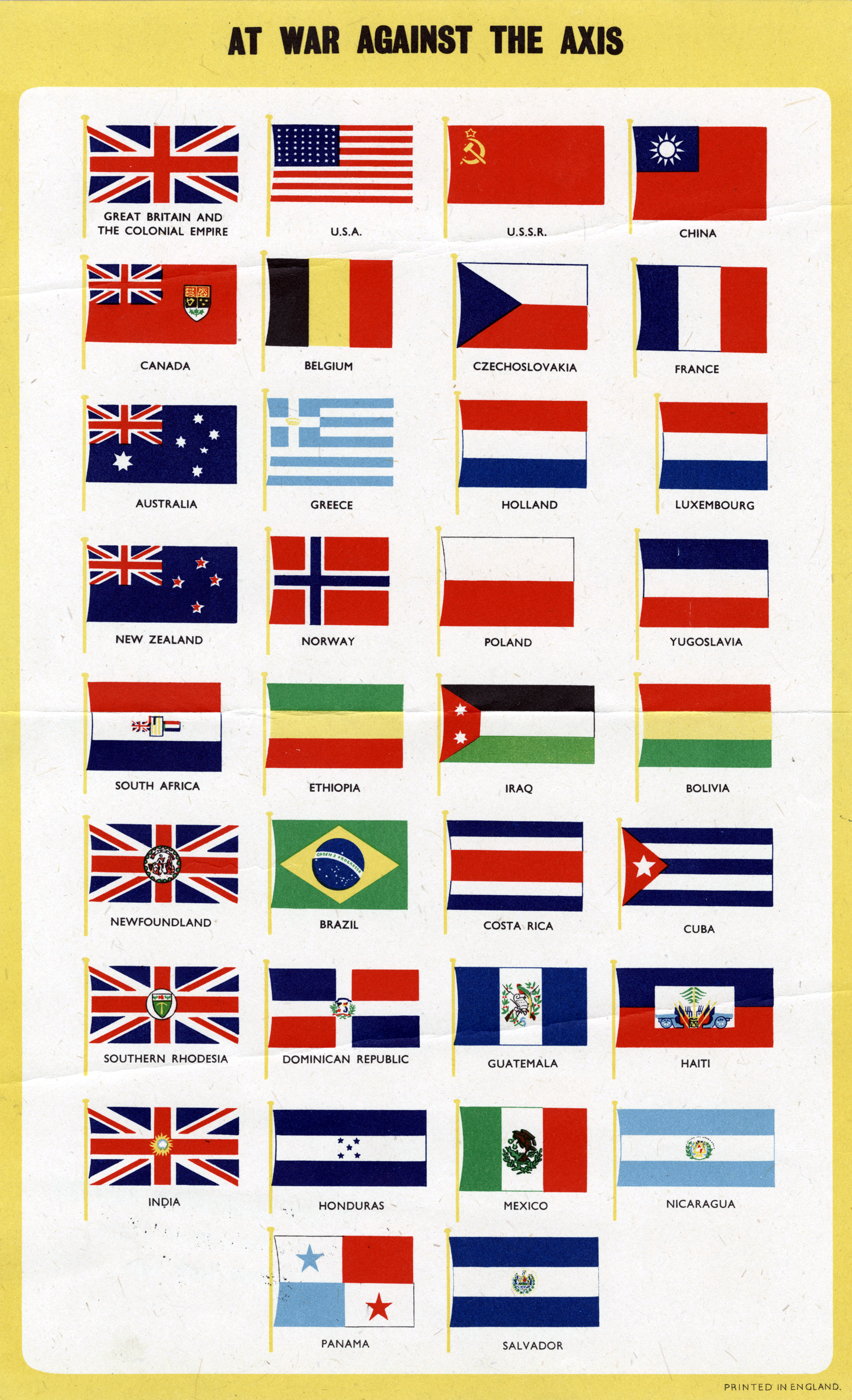
Flags of the Allies as of 1943, after the entry of Iraq and Bolivia

- (Kingdom of Iraq) Iraq: 16 January 1943
- Bolivia: 7 April 1943
- Colombia: 26 July 1943
- (Pahlavi Iran) Iran: 9 September 1943
- (Kingdom of Italy) Italy: 10 October 1943 – former Axis power; Italian Social Republic was founded in September 1943 and continued on the Axis side

=== 1944 ===
- Liberia: 27 January 1944
- (Kingdom of Romania) Romania: 25 August 1944 – former Axis power
- (Tsardom of Bulgaria (1908–1946)) Bulgaria: 8 September 1944 – former Axis power
- (Kingdom of Hungary (1920–1946)) Hungary: 30 December 1944 – former Axis power

=== 1945 ===
- Ecuador: 2 February 1945
- Paraguay: 7 February 1945
- Peru: 12 February 1945
- Uruguay: 15 February 1945
- Venezuela: 15 February 1945
- Turkey: 23 February 1945
- (Kingdom of Egypt) Egypt: 24 February 1945
- Syria: 26 February 1945
- Lebanon: 27 February 1945
- Saudi Arabia: 1 March 1945
- Finland: 3 March 1945 – former ally of Germany in the Continuation War. On 3 March 1945, Finland retroactively declared war on Germany from 15 September 1944.
- Argentina: 27 March 1945
- Chile: 11 April 1945 declared war on Japan.
- Italy: On 14 July 1945 the Kingdom of Italy formally declared war on Japan (Italy and Japan after the surrender)

== See also ==
- Allied leaders of World War II – Political and military leaders of the Allied nations during World War II
- Allied technological cooperation during World War II – Technological alliances of World War II
- Allied war crimes during World War II – War crimes committed by Allied personnel in World War II
- Free World – Propaganda term used to refer to the Western Bloc
- Military production during World War II – Arms and munitions produced during the Second World War
- United Kingdom–United States relations in World War II
  - Tizard Mission – British delegation to the U.S. in 1940 during WWII
- World War II by country

== Works cited ==
- Akio, Tsuchida (2015). "Declaring War as an Issue in Chinese Wartime Diplomacy". In Van de Ven, Hans J.; Lary, Diana; MacKinnon, Stephen R. (eds.). Negotiating China's Destiny in World War II. Stanford University Press. ISBN 9780804789660.
- Dear, Ian C. B. and Michael Foot, eds. (2005). The Oxford Companion to World War II. Comprehensive encyclopedia for all countries.
- Dimbleby, Jonathan (2022). Barbarossa: How Hitler Lost the War. UK: Penguin Books. ISBN 9780241979198.
- Holland R. (1981), Britain and the Commonwealth alliance, 1918–1939, London: Macmillan. ISBN 978-0-333-27295-4.
- Howard, Michael (2014). "Grand Alliance". In Dear, I. C. B.; Foot, M. R. D. (eds.). The Oxford Companion to World War II. Oxford University Press. doi:10.1093/acref/9780198604464.001.0001. ISBN 9780191727603.
- Kimball, Warren (2014). "Lend-lease, or lease-lend". In Dear, I. C. B.; Foot, M. R. D. (eds.). The Oxford Companion to World War II. Oxford University Press. doi:10.1093/acref/9780198604464.001.0001. ISBN 9780191727603.
- Leonard, T. M. (2007). Latin America During World War II. Lanham MD: Rowman & Littlefield. ISBN 978-1-461-63862-9.
- Overy, Richard (1996). Why the Allies Won. New York and London: W. W. Norton & Company. ISBN 0393039250.
- Overy, Richard (1997). Russia's War: A History of the Soviet Effort: 1941–1945. New York: Penguin. ISBN 0-14-027169-4.
- Smith, Gaddis (1965). American Diplomacy During the Second World War, 1941–1945.
- United Nations (1948). Yearbook of the United Nations, 1946-47. New York: Department of Public Information, United Nations.
- Van Slyke, Lyman P. (2014). "China-Burma-India Theatre". In Dear, I. C. B.; Foot, M. R. D. (eds.). The Oxford Companion to World War II. Oxford University Press. doi:10.1093/acref/9780198604464.001.0001. ISBN 9780191727603.
