= United Kingdom and the United Nations =

United Nations membership
- Membership: Full member
- Since: 24 October 1945
- UNSC seat: Permanent
- Ambassador: Barbara Woodward

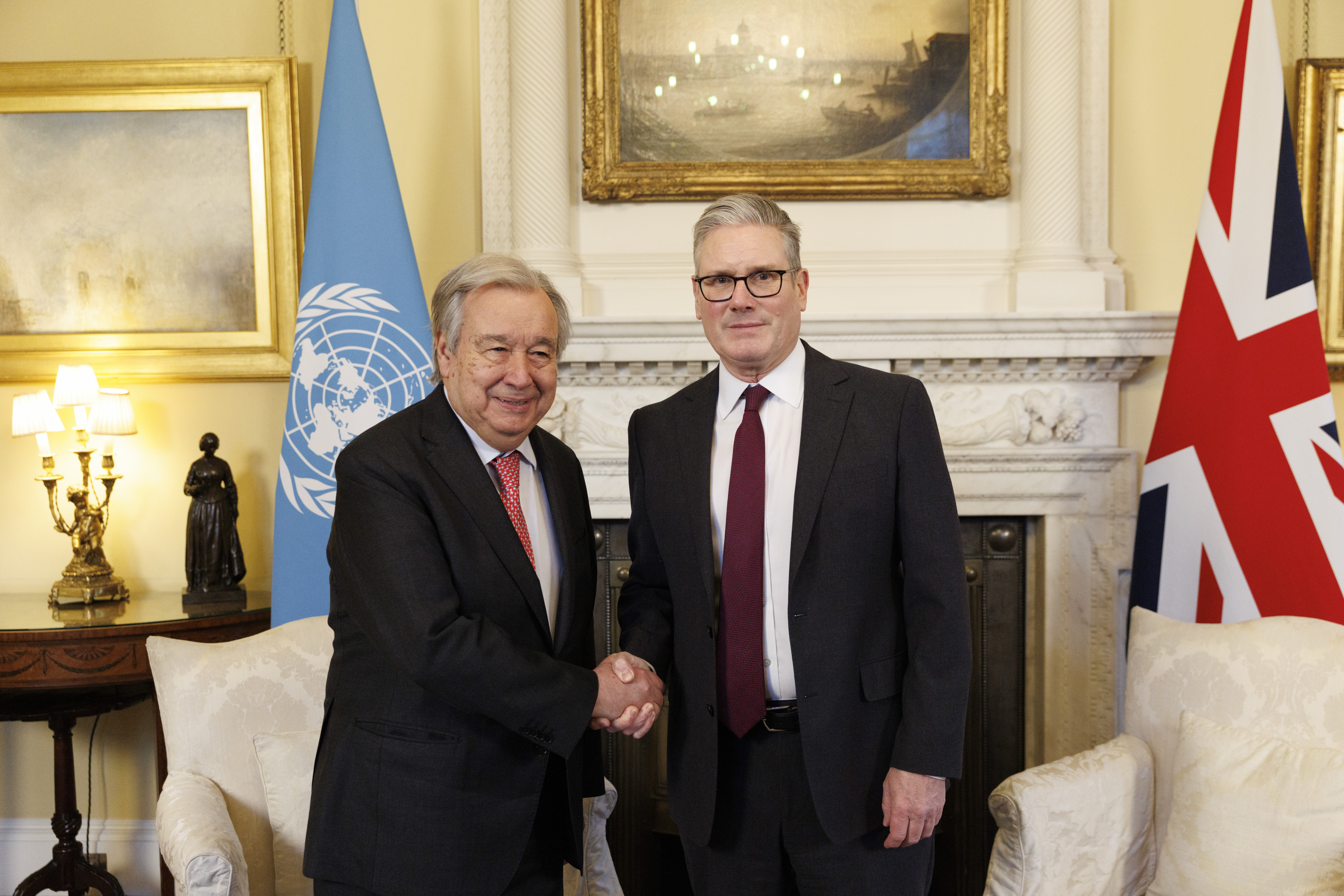
United Nations Secretary General with British Prime Minister Keir Starmer meets António Guterres in 10 Downing Street, January 2026.

The United Kingdom is a founding member of the United Nations and one of five permanent members of the UN Security Council.

As the fifth largest provider of financial contributions to the United Nations, the UK provided 5 percent of the UN budget in 2015, and 6.7 percent of the peacekeeping budget. British English is one of the six official languages of the United Nations, and the United Kingdom is home to the International Maritime Organization, whose head office is in London.

Permanent Missions of the United Kingdom to the United Nations are maintained in New York City, Geneva, and Vienna. These diplomatic missions represent the UK during negotiations and ensure Britain's interests and views are taken into account by UN bodies and other member states.

The United Kingdom also represents the Crown Dependencies and British Overseas Territories at the UN.

== Role in establishing the UN ==
On 12 June 1941, representatives of the United Kingdom, Canada, Australia, New Zealand, the Union of South Africa, and of the exiled governments of Belgium, Czechoslovakia, Greece, Luxembourg, Netherlands, Norway, Poland, and Yugoslavia, as well as General de Gaulle of France, met in London and signed the Declaration of St James's Palace. This was the first step that led up to the founding of the United Nations. The United Kingdom and the USSR agreed a military alliance the next month with the Anglo-Soviet Agreement. The two main principles of these agreements, a commitment to mutual assistance and renunciation of a separate peace, formed the basis for the later Declaration by United Nations.

Following the drafting of the Atlantic Charter in August 1941 by British Prime Minister Winston Churchill and U.S. President Franklin Roosevelt, Churchill visited the White House for the Arcadia Conference in December 1941. During the visit, Roosevelt coined the name "United Nations" and suggested it to Churchill to refer to the Allies of World War II. Roosevelt proposed it as an alternative to "Associated Powers", a term the U.S. used in the First World War (the U.S. was never formally a member of the Allies of World War I but entered the war in 1917 as a self-styled "Associated Power"). Churchill accepted the idea noting the phrase was used by Lord Byron in the poem Childe Harold's Pilgrimage, which referred to the Allies at the Battle of Waterloo in 1815.

The Declaration by United Nations was drafted by Roosevelt and Churchill with Roosevelt's aide Harry Hopkins at the White House in December 1941. The phrase "Four Powers" was used to refer to the four major Allied countries, the United States, United Kingdom, the Soviet Union, and the Republic of China. The term United Nations was first officially used when 26 governments signed this Declaration in January 1942.

The Anglo-Soviet Treaty in May 1942 formed a twenty-year political alliance between the British Empire and the Soviet Union.

At the Quebec Conference in August 1943, British Foreign Secretary Anthony Eden and U.S. Secretary of State Cordell Hull agreed to draft a declaration that included a call for “a general international organization, based on the principle sovereign equality of all nations.”

During the Moscow Conference, the Declaration of the Four Nations on General Security on 30 October 1943 stated the aim of creating "at the earliest possible date of a general international organization." The Tehran Conference followed at which Roosevelt, Churchill and Stalin met and discussed the idea of a post-war international organization

The concept of the United Nations as an international organisation to replace the ineffective League of Nations was formulated and negotiated among the delegations from the Big Four at the Dumbarton Oaks Conference in 1944. During the conference, the U.S. and U.K. delegations met first with the Soviet Union and then with China, since the USSR would not meet with China directly. Churchill, Roosevelt, and Stalin met at the Yalta Conference in February 1945 and agreed to the establishment of the United Nations, as well as the structure of the United Nations Security Council. Churchill urged Roosevelt to restore France to its status of a major Power after the liberation of Paris in August 1944.

After months of planning, the UN Conference on International Organization opened in San Francisco in April 1945 attended by 50 governments and a number of non-governmental organisations involved in drafting the United Nations Charter. The heads of the delegations of the four sponsoring countries (the U.S., the U.K., the Soviet Union, and China) invited the other nations to take part and took turns as chairman of the plenary meetings beginning with Anthony Eden of Britain. At the later meetings, Lord Halifax deputized for Eden.

The UN officially came into existence on 24 October 1945 upon ratification of the Charter by the five permanent members of the Security Council—the U.S., the U.K., France, the Soviet Union and the Republic of China—and by a majority of the other 46 signatories. Gladwyn Jebb served as Acting Secretary-General from 24 October 1945 to 2 February 1946 until the election of the first Secretary-General.

The first meetings of the United Nations General Assembly and the Security Council took place in London beginning in January 1946. The General Assembly met in Westminster Central Hall, and the Security Council met at Church House, Westminster.

The United Kingdom also worked closely with the United States to establish the IMF, World Bank and NATO.

== Veto power in the UN Security Council ==
The United Kingdom has used its Security Council veto power on 32 occasions. The first occurrence was in October 1956 when the United Kingdom and France vetoed a letter from the US to the president of the Security Council concerning Palestine. The last veto was in December 1989 when the United Kingdom, France and the United States vetoed a draft resolution condemning the United States invasion of Panama.

Along with France, the United Kingdom used its power to veto a draft resolution aimed at resolving the Suez Canal crisis in 1956. The UK and France eventually withdrew after the US instigated an 'emergency special session' of the General Assembly, under the terms of the "Uniting for Peace" resolution, which led to the establishment of the United Nations Emergency Force I (UNEF I), by the adoption of Assembly resolution 1001. The UK also used its veto seven times in relation to Rhodesia from 1963 to 1973, five of these occasions were unilateral which are the only occasions on which the UK has used its veto power unilaterally.

== Modernisation and reform ==
The United Kingdom has stated its support for modernisation of the United Nations and reform the Security Council. According to a formal statement made jointly by the United Kingdom and France in 2008:

Reform of the UNSC, both its enlargement and the improvement of its working methods, must therefore succeed. We reaffirm the support of our two countries for the candidacies of Germany, Brazil, India and Japan for permanent membership, as well as for permanent representation for Africa on the Council. ...

We will work with all our partners to define the parameters of such a reform.

UNSC reform requires a political commitment from the member states at the highest level. We will work in this direction in the coming months with a view to achieving effective reform.

== Military operations and peacekeeping ==
Under the United Nations Command, the United Kingdom participated in the Korean War from 1950 to 1953.

In more recent times, the UK contributed to a number of United Nations peacekeeping missions. In the 1990s, the British Armed Forces were part of the United Nations Protection Force from 1992 to 1995, which intervened in the Bosnian War. United Nations Security Council Resolution 1244 authorised the NATO-led Kosovo Force beginning in 1999 in which the UK played a leading role at the outset. The British military intervention in the Sierra Leone Civil War in 2000 supported the United Nations Mission in Sierra Leone. Acting under United Nations Security Council Resolution 1973 in 2011, the UK and other NATO countries intervened in the Libyan Civil War.

As the fifth largest provider of financial contributions to United Nations peacekeeping, the UK provided 6.7 percent of the budget in 2013–15. In September 2015, the UK was contributing 286 troops and five police officers to United Nations peacekeeping missions. In November 1990, it was contributing 769.

The Strategic Defence and Security Review 2015 included a commitment to double the number of UK military personnel contributed to UN peacekeeping operations as well as increasing the number of UK law enforcement and civilian experts on UN peace operations and in UN headquarters.

== See also ==
- European Union and the United Nations
- Permanent Representative of the United Kingdom to the United Nations
- United Nations Association – UK
