= Moscow Conference (1941) =

First Moscow conference

Moscow Conference (1941) Codename: Caviar
- Host country: USSR
- Date: 29 September 1941 – 1 October 1941
- Cities: Moscow
- Venues: Spiridonovka Palace
- Participants: Vyacheslav Molotov; W. Averell Harriman; Lord Beaverbrook
- Chair: Vyacheslav Molotov
- Follows: Second Inter-Allied Meeting
- Precedes: Arcadia Conference

Key points
- Signing of the First Protocol

The First Moscow Conference (Codename: Caviar) of World War II took place from September 29, 1941 to October 1, 1941.

== Prelude ==
The initial contact with the USSR came with Presidential Envoy and Director of the Lend-Lease programme Harry Hopkins with Soviet leader Joseph Stalin in Moscow.

On 30 July 1941 Hopkins briefed journalists at Spaso House, the US Embassy residence. At 20.00, he was described as looking 'pale and tired' and speaking 'faintly, his voice dwindling away at times to an inaudible mumble'. Hopkins confirmed he had spoken with Stalin and had informed the Soviet leader of President Roosevelt's admiration for the Russian resistance to Operation Barbarossa the German invasion of the Soviet Union. Hopkins added that he had told Stalin of the United States' resolve to support the USSR with supplies. Stalin thanked Hopkins and told him the confidence in his country would not be misplaced.

The pair met again at 18.00 the following day at the Kremlin. Hopkins once more returned to Spaso House and brief the press. He described how pleasantries were done away with and they got down to specifics. Hopkins added,

I have nothing to add to what I said the other day, other than that my short visit here has given me even more confidence that Hitler is going to lose.

— Harry Hopkins

Hopkins concluded his business and flew back to London on Friday 1 August.

The Moscow conference was proposed following the meeting between British Prime Minister, Winston Churchill, and US President Franklin D. Roosevelt at Placentia Bay. A joint message was sent to from Churchill and Roosevelt to Joseph Stalin with the proposal. It was delivered to Stalin on August 15 at 18.00 by US Ambassador Laurence Steinhardt and British Ambassador Sir Stafford Cripps. They handed over identical copies signed by Roosevelt and Churchill. Stalin immediately dictated a reply for presentation to the ambassadors giving his agreement to the proposal.

An announcement on Radio Moscow said,

Comrade Stalin requested the American Ambassador (Laurence Steinhardt) and the British Ambassador (Sir Stafford Cripps) to convey to President Roosevelt and Mr. Churchill respectively the heartfelt thanks of the peoples of the Soviet Union and of the Soviet Government for their readiness to aid the U.S.S.R. in its war of liberation against Hitlerite Germany.

— Radio Moscow

== The Conference ==
The delegates flew into Moscow on 28 September. They were greeted by Vice-Commissar Andrei Vyshinsky and the staffs of the British and US embassies. W. Averell Harriman representing the United States and Lord Beaverbrook representing the United Kingdom met with Vyacheslav Molotov (Soviet Minister of Foreign Affairs) presiding.

Their respective ambassadors took the delegates to meet Stalin on the same evening. Molotov was also present along with Maxim Litvinov who was attending as a delegate acted as translator. The conference opened on 29 September at the residence of the Foreign Commissariat, the Spiridonovka Palace. Following a closed session an official communique was released, prepared by Quentin Reynolds (of Collier's magazine) and Vernon Bartlett MP (News Chronicle and BBC).

The formal opening of the Three-Power Moscow Conference took place this morning under the presidency of Molotov. In his opening address he paid high tribute to Lord Beaverbrook and to Mr. Averell Harriman. 'I hope,' he said, 'that the conference will be guided by the high ideals expressed by President Roosevelt and Mr. Churchill on August 15. I would suggest that today we appoint six committees – army, navy, aviation, transport, raw materials, and medical supplies. Time is precious. Let us get to work.'

— excerpt from the official conference communique

This main session lasted for 30 minutes but delegations appointed members for the committees who went into immediate session. They were instructed to have reports on the Soviet requirements ready by the morning of 3 October. The conference reconvened on 1 October, two days ahead of schedule, for the second and final meeting of the main delegations. The agreement signed, known as the First Protocol, was signed on 1 October 1941. The agreement was set to run until June 1942. It promised the Soviet Union 400 aircraft, 500 tanks and 10,000 trucks a month in addition to other supplies.

A joint statement was issued by Lord Beaverbrook and Avril Harriman, separate from the conference communique. The closing paragraph stated,

In concluding its session the conference adheres to the resolution of the three governments that, after the final annihilation of Nazi tyranny, a peace will be established which will enable the world to live in security in its own territory in conditions free from fear or need

— Beaverbrook/Harriman Joint Statement

The delegates departed by Douglas passenger planes on 3 October where they boarded the Halcyon-class minesweeper HMS Harrier in the White Sea. Harrier took them to meet the County-class cruiser HMS London to transfer the party at sea. A gangplank was passed between the two ships and American Admiral William Standley crossed first. Lord Beaverbrook crossed with a rope around his waist in case he fell. The ships separated and London called via loudspeaker "Well done, Harrier, Well done".

In a speech of 6 November 1941 to mark the 24th anniversary of the October Revolution Joseph Stalin said,

... the three power conference in Moscow with the participation of Mr. [Lord] Beaverbrook, the representative of Great Britain, and Mr. Harriman, representative of the United States of America, decided upon systematic assistance to our country with tanks and airplanes. As is well known we have already begun to receive tanks and airplanes on the basis of this decision. Even previously Great Britain had guaranteed the supply to our country of deficit materials such as aluminum, lead, tin, nickel, and rubber. If to this is added the fact that a few days ago the United States of America decided to grant a loan of one billion dollars to the Soviet Union, one can say with assurance that the coalition of the United States of America, Great Britain and the U. S. S. R., is a reality (stormy applause) which is increasing and will increase for the good of our common cause.

— Joseph Stalin

== Churchill's Caviar ==
Aside from the main events of the conference there was an incident regarding the purchase of caviar for Prime Minister Churchill. Philip Jordan was reporting for the News Chronicle from the news conference; his dispatches were also carried by The Times and Lord Beaverbrook's own Daily Express. Jordan learned from an undisclosed source that Lord Beaverbrook had sent an employee to buy £25GBP (approximately $100USD) for the Prime Minister. Churchill read the report and telegraphed Lord Beaverbrook, who in turn asked Jordan about the matter. Jordan refused to name his source and Beaverbrook accused younger officials from the British Embassy of leaking information. It was true that Churchill had ordered the caviar; however, the amount was exaggerated. It was feared that it would reflect badly that such a large quantity of caviar was purchased at a time of rationing.

== See also ==
- Anglo-Soviet Agreement
- Anglo-Soviet Treaty of 1942
- Declaration by United Nations
- Russia–United Kingdom relations#Second World War
- Diplomatic history of World War II
- Second Moscow Conference (1942)
- Third Moscow Conference (1943)
- Fourth Moscow Conference (1944) (TOLSTOY)
- List of Allied World War II conferences
