= Moscow Conference (1942) =

Allied conference during WWII

Moscow Conference Codename:BRACELET
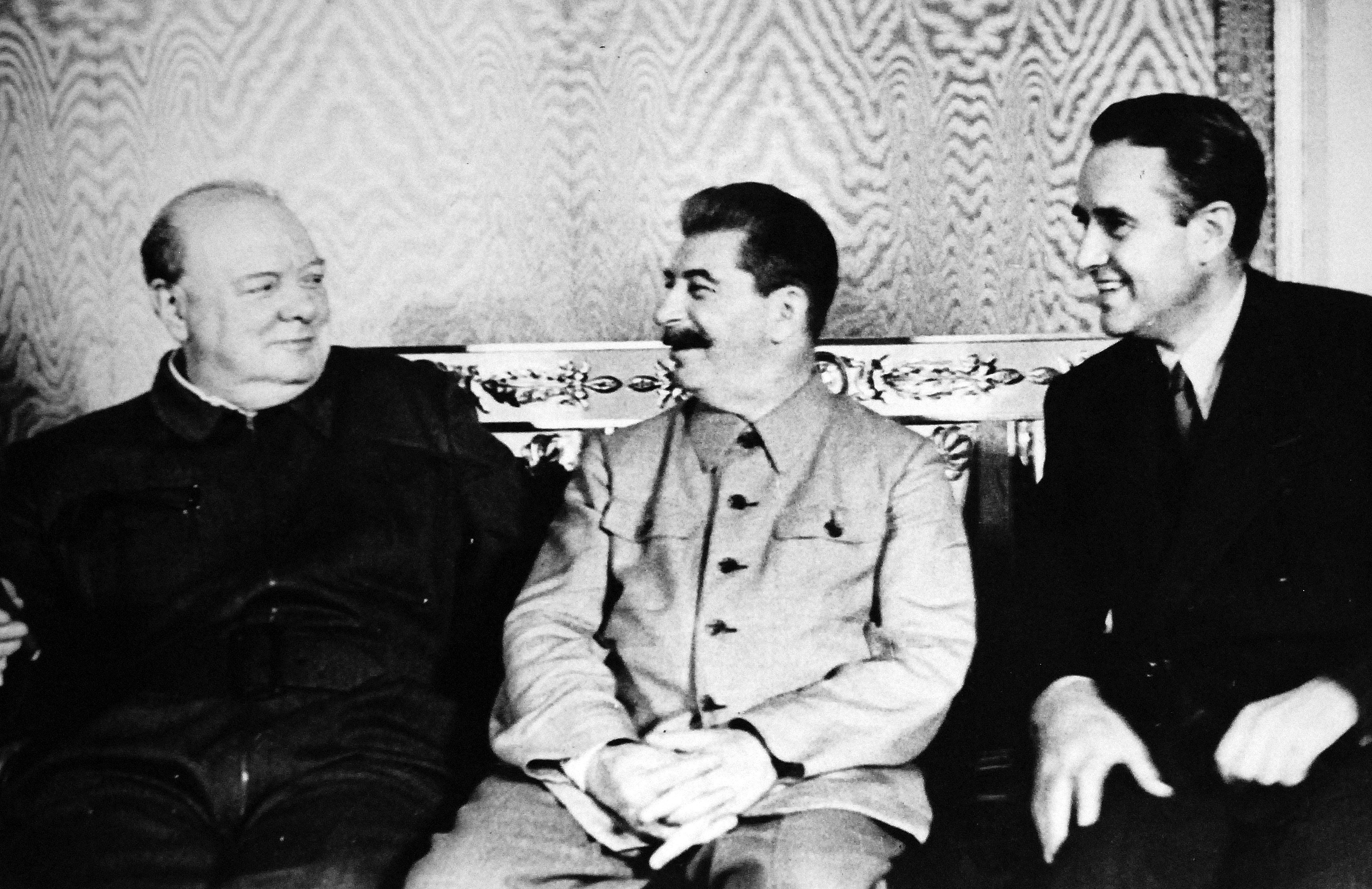
- Left to right: Prime Minister Winston Churchill, Premier Joseph Stalin, and W. Averell Harriman, representing President Franklin D. Roosevelt
- Host country: Soviet Union
- Date: 12–17 August 1942
- Cities: Moscow
- Venues: Moscow Kremlin
- Participants: Joseph Stalin (Soviet Union), Winston Churchill (British Empire) and W. Averell Harriman (United States)
- Follows: Moscow Conference (1941)

The Second Moscow Conference (Codename: Bracelet) between the major Allies of World War II took place from August 12, 1942, to August 17, 1942.

== Prelude ==
On July 30, 1942, Foreign Secretary Anthony Eden passed a message to Prime Minister Winston Churchill from the British Ambassador to the Soviet Union, Sir Archibald Clark Kerr,

Although Molotov professes to have passed on faithfully to the Soviet Government all that was said to him in London and given him in writing...it now looks as if he had to some extent failed to interpret to Stalin the mind of the Prime Minister.

— Sir Archibald Clark Kerr

The ambassador suggested it would be advantageous that Churchill and Soviet leader Stalin should meet. Eden noted in his diary, 'Took the telegram round to Winston...and he jumped at it'. Churchill proposed to Stalin travelling via Cairo to meet him at Astrakhan 'or similar convenient meeting place'. Stalin replied with a formal invitation to meet but stated that Moscow was the only suitable place. This was due to neither himself or his senior staff feeling able to leave the capital during the period of 'intense struggle'.

Eden expressed concerns for the health of the Prime Minister. When told by Eden of the Prime Minister's plans Oliver Harvey wrote, 'But what gallantry of the old gentleman, setting off at 65 across Africa in the heat of mid-summer!' Churchill set aside health concerns, feeling it was his duty to make the journey. He, along with Sir Alexander Cadogan of the Foreign Office who was to travel with him, were given tests at Farnborough on 31 July for high altitude flying. They were exposed to the equivalent of flying at 15,000 feet while wearing oxygen masks and passed fit.

Churchill and his party departed RAF Lyneham shortly after midnight on 1 August 1942 in a Liberator bomber (number AL504), codenamed Commando and piloted by William J. Vanderkloot. Arriving at Gibraltar at dawn, they spent the day there before travelling on to Cairo.

Churchill's wife Clementine who had watched his departure, later wrote to her husband,

I think much of you my Darling & pray that you may be able to penetrate & solve the problem of the Middle East stultification or frustration or what is it? This first part of your journey is less dramatic & sensational than your visit to the Ogre in his Den; but I should imagine it may be more fruitful in results.

— Clementine Churchill, Letter to Winston Churchill

Churchill arrived in Egypt on 4 August, where he stayed at the British Embassy in Cairo. While in Egypt he took the decision to relieve Claude Auchinleck as Commander-in-Chief. The command split, creating Near East and Middle East commands. Auchinleck was to be replaced by Harold Alexander as C-in-C Near East. Lieutenant-General William Gott was to become commander of the Eighth Army. When he was killed, the decision was made to appoint Bernard Montgomery. While in Egypt he inspected troops and positions before departing for Tehran after midnight on 10 August.

After meetings in the city, the journey was continued to Moscow on August 12. The party arrived at 17.00 the same day after a 10 and a half hour flight.

== Moscow ==
=== 12 August ===
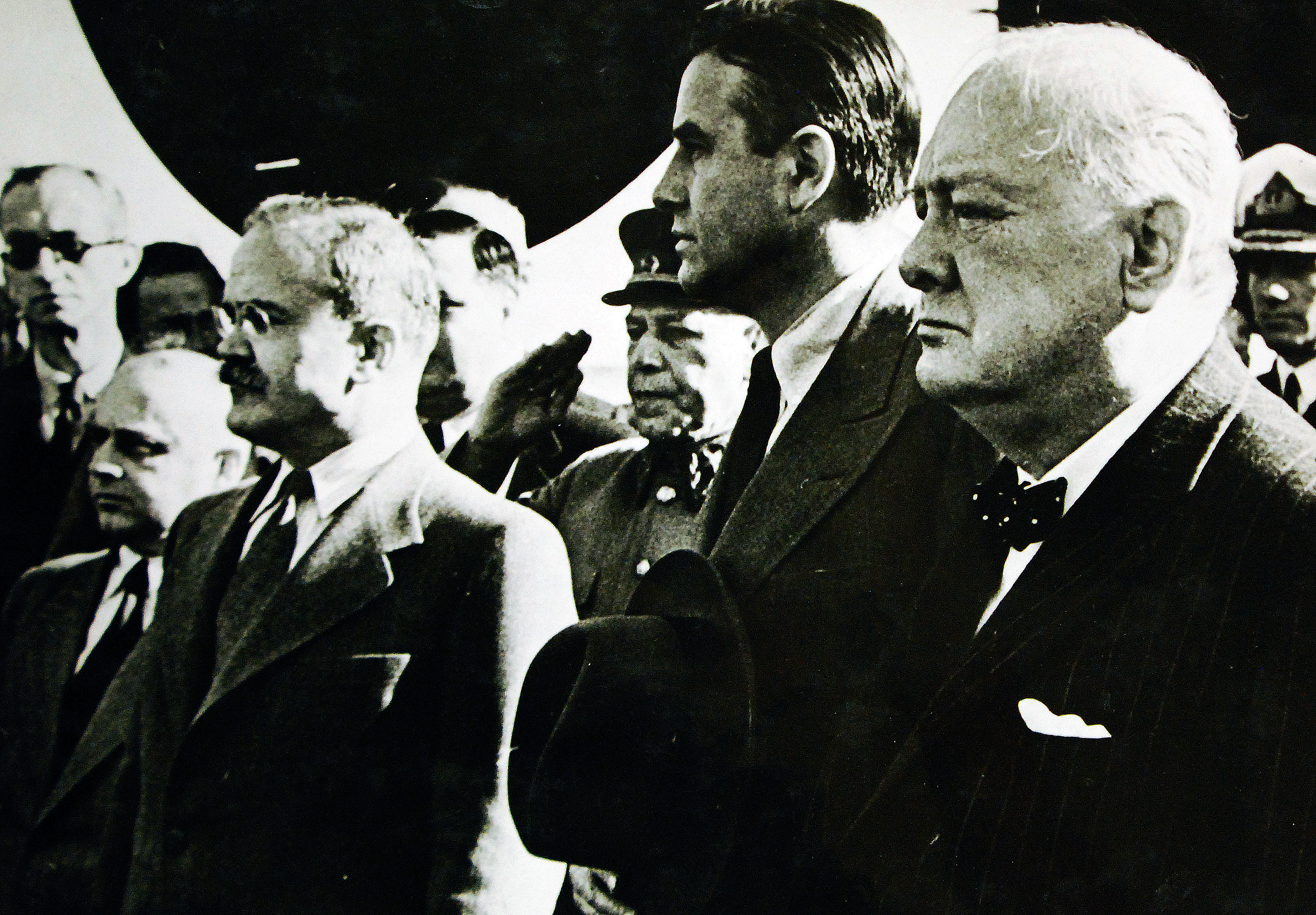
Moscow Conference, August 12–17, 1942. Left to right, foreground: V. M. Molotov, Peoples' Commissar for Foreign Affairs; W. Averrell Harriman, representing President Franklin D. Roosevelt; Prime Minister Winston Churchill, while reviewing troops at Moscow Civil Airport while other Russian officials look on. Immediately behind Churchill is Admiral Miles, Chief, of the British Military Mission to the Soviet Union. Office of War Information Photograph. (2016/01/15).

The British delegation led by Churchill and Cadogan was met by Foreign Minister Vyacheslav Molotov and Chief of Staff, Marshal Boris Shaposhnikov. Upon arrival Churchill and American representative Averell Harriman inspected an honour guard. Churchill then addressed the assembly saying,

...we will continue, hand in hand, whatever our sufferings, whatever our toils, we will continue hand in hand, like comrades and brothers until every vestige of the Nazi régime has been beaten into the ground, until the memory only of it remains as an example and a warning for a future time.

— Winston Churchill,

State Villa No. 7 was allocated to Churchill while Harriman stayed at the US Embassy. Of the villa, Churchill wrote, 'Everything was prepared with totalitarian lavishness'. He was supplied with an aide-de-camp and 'a number of veteran servants in white jackets and beaming smiles'.

Churchill was collected from the villa at 19.00 and taken to the Kremlin and his first meeting with Stalin. The initial meeting was only a small party consisting of Churchill, Major Charles Dunlop (Embassy Interpreter), Clark Kerr and Harriman. This was due to the aeroplane carrying the rest of the delegation having to return to Tehran because of a technical fault.

Churchill reported to London that the first two hours 'were bleak and sombre'. Stalin reported grave problems on the Eastern Front and that the Germans were making 'a tremendous effort to get to Baku and Stalingrad'. The conversation moved on to the possibility of a second front in 1942, which the Soviets were hoping for. Churchill reported that after an 'exhaustive Anglo-American examination', the western allies did not feel able to launch an attack across the English Channel in September 1942. He was able to report that preparations were in hand for a landing by 48 divisions in 1943. Churchill added that even by the time the 1943 operation was ready it was conceivable that the Germans may be able to field a stronger force to oppose them. At this the minutes of the meeting note, 'Stalin's face crumpled into a frown'.

After further conversation regarding a Second Front in France, Stalin said that the British 'should not be so afraid of the Germans'. He went on to ask, 'Why were we [the British] so afraid of the Germans?' Churchill offered 1940 and the German failure to land troops as a comparable situation, saying that Hitler 'was afraid of the operation'. Stalin disagreed but consented to allow the respective generals to go into the details of the operation.

Churchill turned to the subject of bombing Germany, stating "If need be, as the war went on, we hoped to shatter almost every dwelling in almost every German city". This improved Stalin's mood and Churchill to the subject of a second front in 1942. He relayed to Stalin that the Western Allies had decided on another operation, as France was not the only area to attack. He had been authorised to share this secret by President Roosevelt with Stalin. At this, the minutes record, 'M. Stalin sat up and grinned'. Churchill then proceeded to outline the details of the Anglo-American landings in French North Africa, Operation Torch.

The British were nervous that Stalin and Hitler might make separate peace terms; Stalin insisted that would not happen. Churchill explained how Arctic convoys bringing munitions to Russia had been intercepted by the Germans; there was a delay now so that future convoys would be better protected. He apologetically explained there would be no second front this year—no British-American invasion of France—which Stalin had been urgently requesting for months. The will was there, said Churchill, but there was not enough American troops, not enough tanks, not enough shipping, not enough air superiority. Instead the British, and soon the Americans, would step up bombing of German cities and railways. Furthermore, there would be Operation Torch in November. It would be a major Anglo-American invasion of North Africa, which would set the stage for an invasion of Italy and perhaps open the Mediterranean for munitions shipments to Russia through the Black Sea. The talks started out on a very sour note but after many hours of informal conversations, the two men understood each other and knew they could cooperate smoothly.

Once Churchill had completed his explanation of the Operation Torch and the strategy to open up the Mediterranean, Stalin said, "May God help this enterprise to succeed". The minutes record that at this point Stalin's 'interest was now at a high pitch'.

The conversation continued until this first meeting of Stalin, Churchill and Harriman drew to a close at 22.40 after three hours and forty minutes. Churchill later signalled to his deputy in London, Labour leader Clement Attlee -

He [Stalin] knows the worst, and we parted in an atmosphere of goodwill.

— Winston Churchill, Signal to Clement Attlee

=== 13 August ===
On the second day Churchill began with a meeting at the Kremlin with Commissar for Foreign Affairs, Molotov. Churchill took Molotov over the various operations in the West, across the abandoned Operation Sledgehammer and Operation Round-Up to the buildup of American forces in Britain, Operation Bolero. The discussion took in the upcoming Operation Torch and the possibilities for Operation Jupiter, the proposed Anglo-Soviet landing in Norway. Churchill, in a telegraph to London, said 'He [Molotov] listened affably but contributed nothing'. As he was leaving Churchill turned to Molotov and said, "Stalin will make a great mistake to treat us roughly when we have come so far". To which Molotov replied, "Stalin is a very wise man. You may be sure that, however he argues, he understands all. I will tell him what you say".

The aircraft carrying the remainder of the British delegation arrived at 17.00 and they joined Churchill for his second meeting with Stalin at 23.00. Stalin opened the meeting with an aide-memoire attacking the abandoning of plans for a Second Front in 1942. Churchill listened to the document being translated and stated he would reply in writing but that 'we [Britain and America] have made up our minds upon the course to be pursued and that reproaches were vain'. Stalin attacked the British military effort, "You British are afraid of fighting. You should not think the Germans are supermen. You will have to fight sooner or later. You cannot win a war without fighting". Harriman passed Churchill a note urging him not to take Stalin's words seriously, as he had behaved in the same way during the Moscow Conference in 1941.

Churchill called for Colonel Ian Jacob to enter the room and take down what was being said. Churchill expressed his 'disappointment that Stalin should apparently not believe the sincerity of his statements, and distrust his motives'. Churchill then launched into what Harriman described as 'the most brilliant' of his wartime speeches. Even the translator 'got so enthralled by Winston's speech that he put his pencil down'. So swept up in the moment Churchill didn't leave space for the interpreter to relay the last part and Dunlop was not able to relay them verbatim. Stalin laughed, not having heard much of the speech, and said,

Your words are not important, what is vital is the spirit

— Joseph Stalin, addressing Winston Churchill

Churchill got Dunlop to get the precise wording from Jacob's minutes and relay it to Stalin. Churchill wrote to Attlee of the encounter, 'I repulsed all his contentions squarely but without taunts of any kind. I suppose he is not used to being contradicted repeatedly but he did not become at all angry or even animated. On one occasion I said, "I pardon that remark only on account of the bravery of the Russian troops."'

=== 14 August ===
After having lunch with guests including General Brooke and US Ambassador William H. Standley, Churchill retired for his usual afternoon rest. He returned to the Kremlin at 21.00 for his third meeting with Stalin.

They went straight into a dinner of around 100 guests. Shortly after sitting, Molotov made a toast to Churchill's health. Churchill in turn replied with a toast to Stalin and he toasted President Roosevelt's heath, as well as that of Harriman. The toasts continued with Stalin going over to click glasses with those whose health he had toasted. This left the Prime Minister without opportunity for conversation with the Soviet leader.

After nearly four hours, Stalin took Churchill into a neighbouring room for coffee and liquors. They were also photographed together and with Harriman. Stalin proposed a film screening but at this Churchill retired to his allocated villa to rest. As he telegraphed to Attlee he, 'was afraid we should be drawn into a lengthy film and was fatigued'.

After shaking hands with Stalin, Churchill took his leave. Stalin hurried after his guest and escorted him through the halls of the Kremlin to the front door, where they again shook hands. Ambassador Clark Kerr reported to Eden,

This long walk, or rather trot, for he [Stalin] had to be brisk in order to keep pace with Mr. Churchill, is, I understand, without precedent in the history of the Soviet Kremlin in so far as we have impinged upon it.

— Sir Archibald Clark Kerr

=== 15 August ===
Churchill called for Colonel Jacob at 09.00 to discuss the stormy encounter of 13 August. He had second thoughts about the meeting, wondering if Stalin, 'had perhaps not meant to be as insulting as he [Churchill] first thought'. Jacob recommended another meeting, one-to-one. However, given the importance of the discussion and that Dunlop had been found wanting, Jacob suggested 'we [the British] should fit him [Churchill] out' with a bilingual member of the British Military Mission. Major Arthur Herbert Birse was recommended to which Churchill agreed.

Born in St. Petersburg to British parents in 1891, Birse had native fluency in Russian which came from his schooling in the country. This was contrary to the practice of other British families there who sent their children to Britain for their education. He joined the British Military Mission in Russia in 1917 as an interpreter. Following the Bolshevik Revolution he moved to Britain and worked for a bank. This saw him sent to Poland and Italy where he learned those languages too. He returned to the military with the outbreak of war and was sent to Russia following the German invasion.

The Prime Minister's car entered the Kremlin just before 19.00 and the pair were escorted to a large conference room to meet Stalin. The four, Churchill, Birse, Stalin and his interpreter Vladimir Pavlov, sat at the head of the table. Churchill thanked Stalin "for all the courtesy and hospitality" before stating -

I realised that what I had to say about the opening of a second front would be very painful to our Russian friends and so I thought it would be my duty to come myself to see you, Premier Stalin – that it would be more friendly and proof of my sincere feelings if I came myself – rather than communicate through our Ambassador or by exchange of telegrams.

— Winston Churchill, noted by interpreter Major Birse

Stalin replied that their "personal exchange of views has been of the most importance" and that "the fact that we have met is of very great value". While acknowledging that they have had some disagreement he felt that in meeting "the ground has been prepared for future agreement". The discussion moved onto the American buildup of troops in the UK, which in August 1942 stood at 85,000, against a target of 1 million. They then moved on to Operation Torch and the benefits to Russia, which Churchill acknowledged would be affected 'indirectly'. Churchill also explained a planned 'reconnaissance in force' which was the approaching Dieppe Raid. This was described as an action to "make Germany anxious about a attack from across the Channel" with "some 8,000 men with 50 tanks". Stalin then took Churchill over the situation on the Eastern Front along with plans to defend the Caucasus and block the German drive towards the Baku Oilfields. The discussions left Churchill feeling, as he explained in a telegram to Attlee, that there was 'an even chance' of the Caucasus being held but General Brooke 'will not go as far as this'.

==== Stalin's Apartment ====
Churchill rose to leave, he was due to dine with General Władysław Anders of the Polish Armed Forces in the East to discuss their deployment to the Middle East. Stalin asked when he and Churchill would meet again. To this Churchill explained that he would be leaving at dawn. Stalin met this news with the question, "Why do you not come over to my apartment in the Kremlin and have some drinks?" Churchill consented and Stalin led the way to his apartment, which Churchill described as being 'of moderate size, simple, dignified, and four in number'. They were joined by his daughter Svetlana and Molotov. When Churchill realised he was to stay for a dinner and not just drinks he instructed Birse to telephone to his villa and let Anders know. The party dined from 2:30 until 2:30 the following morning [16 August]. The discussions were wide-ranging, covering topics from the supply of lorries to the Red Army, the Napoleonic Wars, the Duke of Marlborough and the introduction of collective farms in the Soviet Union. Sir Alexander Cadogan entered at around 01:00 [16 August] with the draft communiqué from the conference. At this moment a suckling pig arrived, Cadogan declined Stalin's invitation to join him and Stalin ate the pig by himself.

Cadogan described the scene in a letter to Lord Halifax -

There I found Winston and Stalin, and Molotov who has joined them, sitting with a heavily-laden board between them: food of all kinds crowned by a sucking pig, and innumerable bottles. What Stalin made me drink seemed pretty savage: Winston, who by that time was complaining of a slight headache, seemed wisely to be confining himself to a comparatively innocuous effervescent Caucasian red wine. Everyone seemed to be as merry as a marriage bell.

— Sir Alexander Cadogan, Letter to Lord Halifax

The Soviet leader then went to an adjoining room to receive reports from the front. When he returned at around 2.30 the final communiqué had been agreed and Churchill took his leave. He had a 30 minutes drive to the villa, General Anders to meet and a 'splitting headache, which for me [Churchill] was very unusual'. After this there was the long drive back to the airport for his return to the UK.

=== 16 August ===
Churchill finally made it back to State Villa No. 7 at 03.15 on the morning of 16 August. General Anders was still awaiting the Prime Minister along with the British Chief of the Imperial General Staff (CIGS) General Brooke. Churchill said, "Ah! my poor Anders. I have been detained by M. Stalin and now I must fly off, but you come along to Cairo and we shall have a talk there". Anders had already flown to Moscow from Tashkent and made preparations to carry on to Cairo as if, as General Brooke recalled, 'it was in the next street'.

Churchill bathed and then relayed the content of his discussions to Ambassador Clark Kerr and Colonel Jacob. Jacob recorded that, 'The Prime Minister was very tired and lay talking with his eyes shut. Nevertheless, he was very satisfied with the way things had gone, and felt that his visit had turned out a great success'.

Molotov arrived at the villa at 04:30 to escort the party to the airfield where they arrived by 05:00. As dawn was breaking a band played Internationale, God Save the King and the Star Spangled Banner as the Prime Minister stood to attention and saluted. The party departed in a formation of four Liberator bombers at 05:30 after ceremonies were completed.

Churchill telegraphed to Attlee,

On the whole I am definitely encouraged by my visit to Moscow. I am sure that the disappointing news I brought could not have been imparted except by me personally without leading to a really serious drifting apart.

— Winston Churchill, Telegram to Clement Attlee

Returning via Tehran and Cairo, where he held further meetings, Churchill arrived at RAF Lyneham to be greeted by Clementine on the evening of 24 August. The Times of 18 August reported the talks. They were described as being done 'in an atmosphere of cordiality and complete sincerity'.

== Dramatisation of events ==
Howard Brenton's dramatisation of the 1942 Moscow Conference, Churchill in Moscow, premiered at the Orange Tree Theatre in London during February-March 2025. Roger Allam and Peter Forbes played Churchill and Stalin. The other non-fictional characters were portrayed by Alan Cox (Archie Clark Kerr), Julius D'Silva (Molotov), and Tamara Greatrex (Svetlana Stalin).

== See also ==
- Anglo-Soviet Agreement
- Anglo-Soviet Treaty of 1942
- Russia–United Kingdom relations#Second World War
- Diplomatic history of World War II
- First Moscow Conference (1941)
- Third Moscow Conference (1943)
- Fourth Moscow Conference (1944) (TOLSTOY)
- List of Allied World War II conferences
