= Declaration of the Four Nations =

WWII Allied powers' declaration

The Declaration of the Four Nations on General Security, or Four Power Declaration, was signed on 30 October 1943, at the Moscow Conference by the Big Four: the United States, the United Kingdom, the Soviet Union, and China. The declaration formally established the four-power framework that would later influence the international order of the postwar world. It was one of four declarations signed at the conference; the others were the Declaration on Italy, the Declaration on Austria, and the Declaration on German Atrocities.

== Drafting ==
At the Quebec Conference in August 1943, U.S. Secretary of State Cordell Hull and British Foreign Secretary Anthony Eden agreed to draft a declaration that included a call for “a general international organization, based on the principle sovereign equality of all nations.”

The declaration was drafted by US State Department advisers such Sumner Welles. Hull presented it to President Franklin D. Roosevelt on 10 August. Their proposal eschewed the regional councils, preferred by British Prime Minister Winston Churchill, in favour of establishing an international postwar organization.

It omitted any discussion of the potentially-controversial establishment of a permanent peacekeeping force after the war. Instead, its stated aim was simply the creation "at the earliest possible date of a general international organization."

Roosevelt discussed the proposal with Churchill and Anthony Eden when they met at Quebec. Roosevelt stressed that the declaration would "in no way prejudice final decisions as to world order" and that the declaration was only an interim agreement. Churchill and Roosevelt reached a consensus that the declaration should be given high priority at the Moscow Conference, but Stalin wanted the conference to focus on the ongoing war against Germany. The Soviets also objected to the inclusion of the Republic of China as the fourth Great Power of the declaration, officially on the grounds that the Moscow Conference was planned as a meeting between three Great Powers (the US, UK and the Soviet Union). Roosevelt suspected that Stalin's true motivations were to avoid antagonizing the Japanese with whom they had signed a non-aggression pact in 1941. Churchill's view was that Stalin had a similar reluctance to recognize China as a Great Power.

== See also ==
- Diplomatic history of World War II
- History of the United Nations
- List of Allied World War II conferences
