= Moscow Conference (1943) =

Summit of WWII Allies

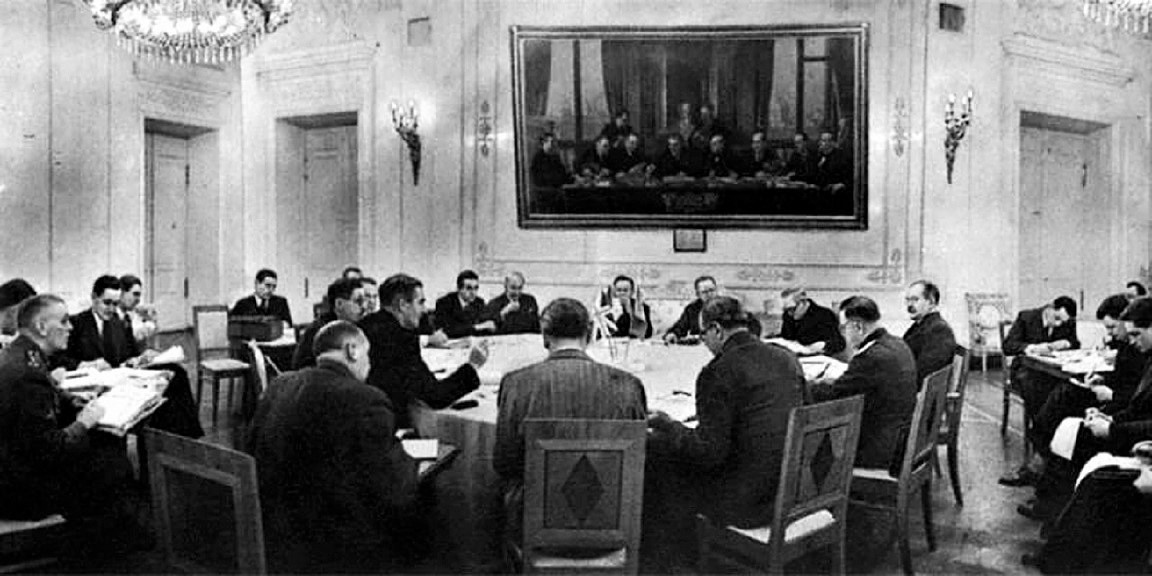
Moscow Conference, 1943

The Third Moscow Conference between the major Allies of World War II took place during October 18 to November 11, 1943, at the Moscow Kremlin and Spiridonovka Palace. It was composed of major diplomats, ministers and generals, who discussed cooperation in the war effort, and issued the Moscow Declaration.

== History ==
A series of twelve meetings took place between the foreign ministers of the United Kingdom (Anthony Eden), the United States (Cordell Hull), and the Soviet Union (Vyacheslav Molotov), resulted in the Moscow Declarations and the creation of the European Advisory Commission. During the Moscow Conference of 1943, the Soviet Union finally came to agreement with the United States and its allies to create a world organization. The Ambassador of Republic of China in the Soviet Union, Foo Ping-sheung, was invited to sign the Declaration of the Four Nations.

Among those who also attended for the United States were Ambassador of the United States W. Averell Harriman, Major General John R. Deane of the United States Army, Green H. Hackworth, and James C. Dunn; for the United Kingdom, His Majesty's Ambassador Sir Archibald Clerk Kerr, William Strang, and Lt. General Sir Hastings Ismay; for the Soviet Union, the Marshal of the Soviet Union Joseph Stalin, K. E. Voroshilov, A. Y. Vyshinski, Deputy People's Commissar for Foreign Affairs M. M. Litvinov, Deputy People's Commissar for Foreign Trade V. A. Sergeyev, Major-General A. A. Gryslov of the General Staff, and Senior Official of the People's Commissariat for Foreign Affairs G. F. Saksin.

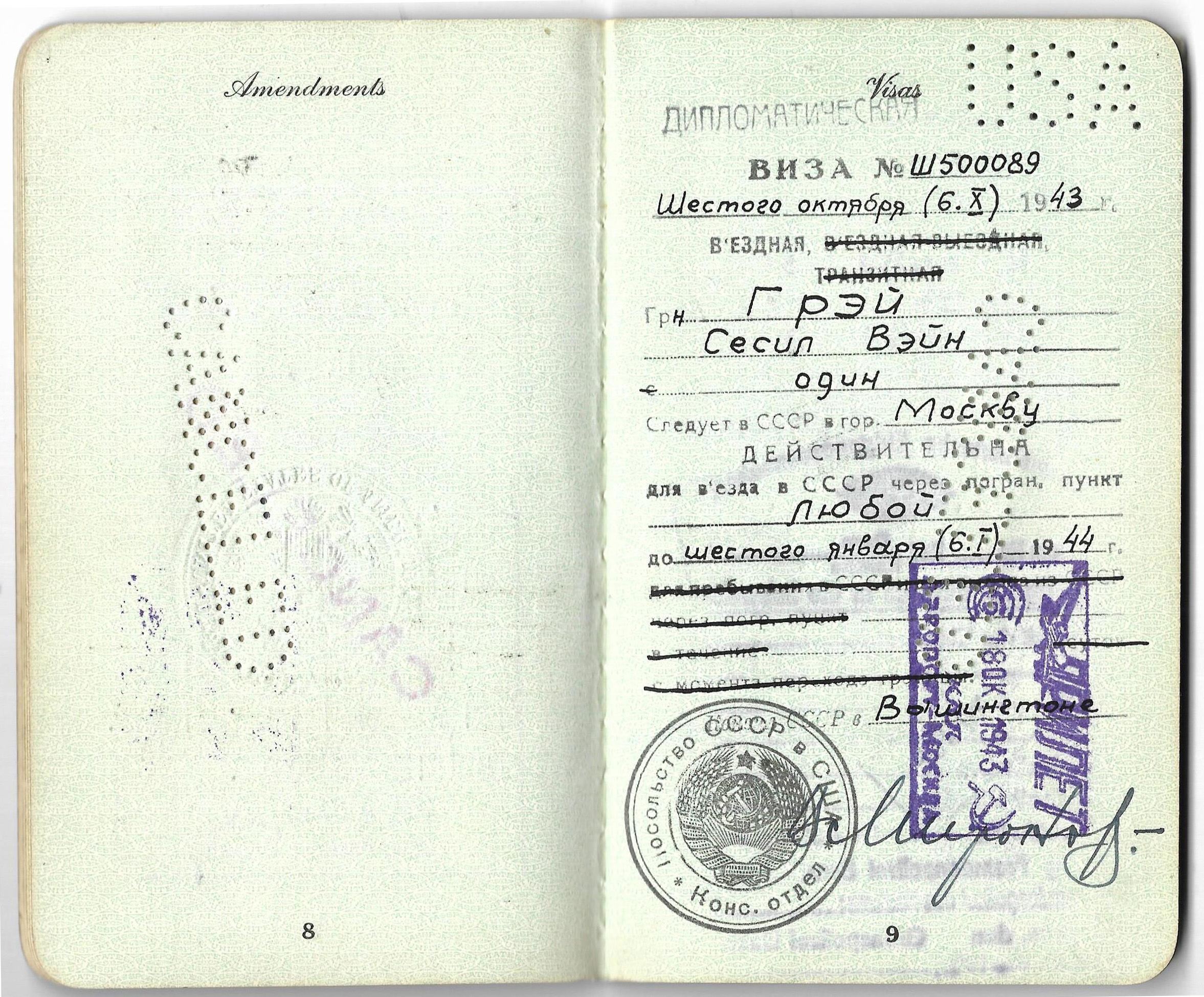
1943 Soviet Diplomatic visa issued in the US to attend the Moscow Conference

== Objectives of the conference ==
The Third Moscow Conference was one of the first times in which foreign ministers of the United States, the United Kingdom, and the Soviet Union could meet and discuss important global matters. Here, they discussed what measures needed to be taken in order to shorten and end the war with Germany and the Axis Powers, as well as how to effectively collaborate and cooperate peacefully through this period marking the end of the war. The Moscow Declaration, officially issued by the foreign ministers of United States President Franklin Roosevelt, Prime Minister Winston Churchill of the United Kingdom, and Premier Joseph Stalin of the Soviet Union, defined how these issues would be dealt with. It included four sections, Declaration of Four Nations on General Security, Declaration Regarding Italy, Declaration on Austria, and Statement on Atrocities.

Also during the Moscow Conference, agreements were made to establish a European Advisory Commission to make recommendations for the three joint governments and an Advisory Council regarding Italy – along with Greece and Yugoslavia.

In the case of Italy, the declaration stated that Fascism must be utterly destroyed in Italy, that all fascists should be barred from participation in public life and that "democratic organs" of local government should be created within Italy by the occupying powers.

In the case of Austria, the German annexation of Austria in 1938 was declared null and void. But the people of Austria as a whole were held responsible in the declaration for participation in the war on the side of Germany.

In the "Statement on Atrocities", it was declared that after any armistice with the present or a future German government, that those German individuals suspected of involvement in wartime atrocities in various countries would be sent to those countries for trial and punishment.

== See also ==
- Anglo-Soviet Agreement
- Anglo-Soviet Treaty of 1942
- Declaration by United Nations
- Russia–United Kingdom relations#Second World War
- Diplomatic history of World War II
- First Moscow Conference (1941)
- Second Moscow Conference (1942)
- Fourth Moscow Conference (1944) (TOLSTOY)
- List of Allied World War II conferences
- History of the United Nations
