= Moscow Conference (1944) =

World War II summit

The Fourth Moscow Conference, also known as the Tolstoy Conference for its code name Tolstoy, was a meeting in Moscow between Winston Churchill and Joseph Stalin from 9 to 19 October 1944.

== Procedures ==
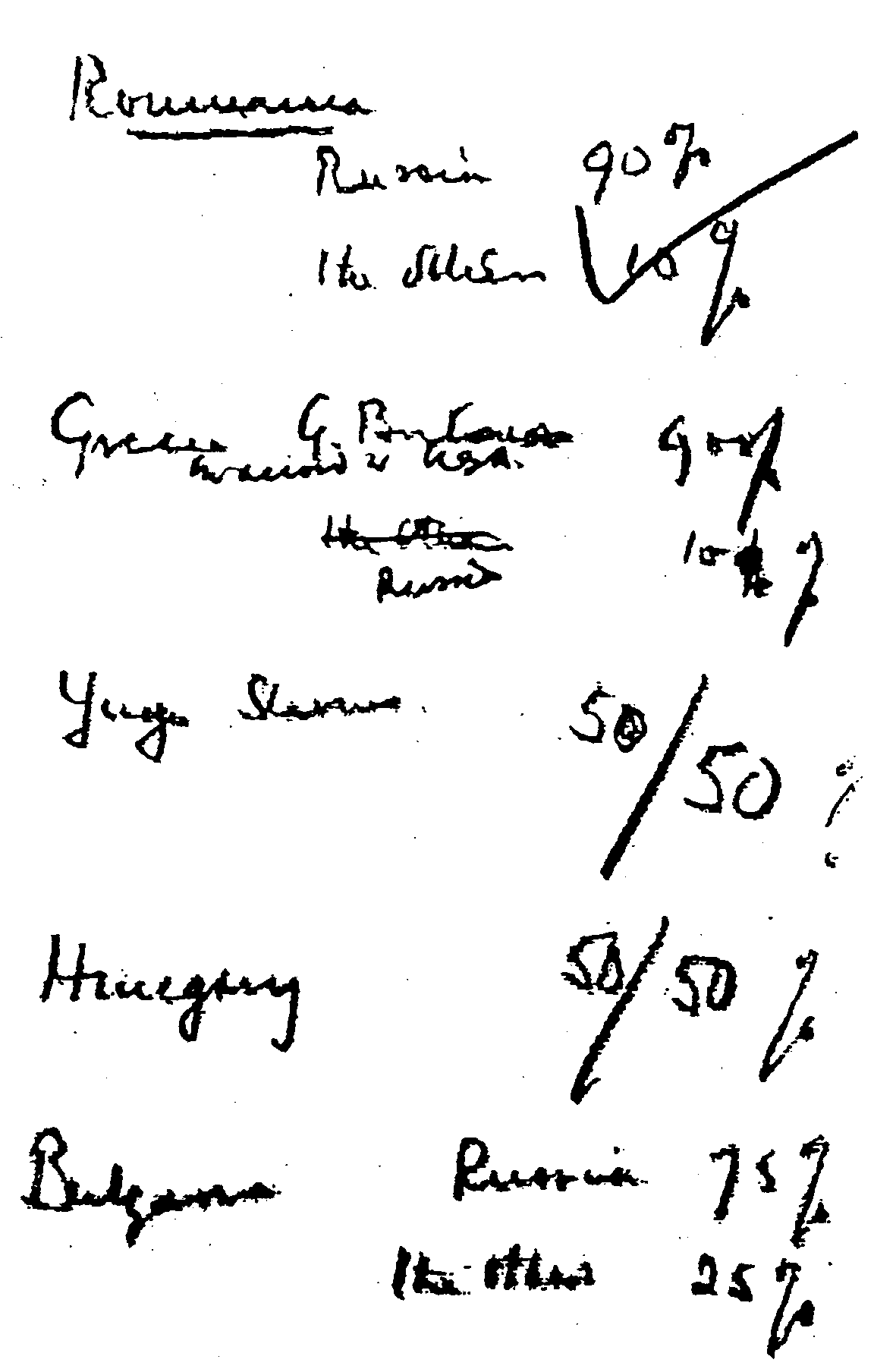
The percentages agreement

According to Churchill's memoirs, Churchill made a secret proposal on a scrap of paper to divide postwar Europe into Western and Soviet spheres of influence. Stalin, apparently examined the scrap of paper and pondered it for a moment, wrote a large check in blue pencil and handed it back to Churchill. Churchill commented: "Might it not be thought rather cynical if it seemed we had disposed of such issues, so fateful to millions of people, in such an offhand manner? Let us burn the paper". Stalin counselled, however, to save the historic scrap of paper. Churchill called the scrap of paper a "naughty document", which came to be known as the "Percentages agreement".

These originally-proposed spheres of influence that Churchill were nominated to Stalin in percentages:

- Romania = 90% Russian and 10% The Others,
- Greece = 90% Great Britain (in accord with US) and Russian 10%,
- Yugoslavia = 50–50%,
- Hungary = 50–50%,
- Bulgaria = 75% Russian and 25% The Others, and
- Poland is 'briefly discussed before moving on to the Balkans' – according to the 1974 journal article by Albert Resis on the 1953 vol. 6 memoirs, Triumph and Tragedy, by Winston Churchill.

The US ambassador to the Soviet Union, representing President Roosevelt, Averell Harriman, was not present for the discussions, but Churchill informed Roosevelt on 10 October of an agreement after more deliberations. However, it is not certain to what extent the true details were made known at the time. Roosevelt was conditionally supportive but was ultimately unhappy with the level of US influence in the Balkans, specifically Bulgaria, which was the sticking point for the discussion. That resulted in the original percentages being haggled over for some days.

A significant consequence of the agreement was the Cold War, according to Resis, because of its prewar imperialist thought of Churchill and Stalin. It removed the free choice of Eastern Europe and Mediterranean peoples from choosing their own path forward free from Nazi occupation.

The proposed percentage division was never mentioned at Yalta Conference or other meetings. Norman Naimark states that it "confirmed that Eastern Europe, initially at least, would lie within the sphere of influence of the Soviet Union". However, the British historian Andrew Roberts stated:

The Second Moscow Conference was not able to resolve major issues and Eastern Europe, and when Churchill did complete his percentages deal with Stalin, it was not ratified by the Americans.

Stalin agreed that the Soviet Union would enter the war against Japan, and the British agreed to return to the Soviets all former Soviet citizens who had been liberated from the Germans.

There has never been a confirmation of this agreement and the sole source is Churchill's memoirs. As early as 1958, the authenticity of Churchill's claim has come into question.

== Representatives present ==
The chief representatives for the Soviet Union at the conference were Joseph Stalin, the Soviet premier, and Vyacheslav Molotov the Soviet foreign minister. The United Kingdom's principal representatives were Winston Churchill, the prime minister, and Anthony Eden, the foreign secretary. The Chief of the Imperial General Staff, Field Marshal Sir Alan Brooke was also present, as were the United States ambassador to Moscow, Averell Harriman, and General John R. Deane, head of the United States Military Mission in Moscow as observers.

Also at the conference were delegations from both the London-based Polish government-in-exile and the communist Lublin-based Polish Committee of National Liberation.

== See also ==
- Anglo-Soviet Agreement (1941)
- Second Inter-Allied Meeting (1941)
- Declaration by United Nations
- Anglo-Soviet Treaty of 1942
- Diplomatic history of World War II
- First Moscow Conference (1941)
- Second Moscow Conference (1942)
- Third Moscow Conference (1943)
- List of Allied World War II conferences
- Russia–United Kingdom relations § Second World War
