= Four Powers =

Four Powers may refer to:

- Four Powers of the Allied Control Council who occupied Germany (1945–1949/1991) and Austria (1945–1955) following the end of World War II: France, United Kingdom, United States, Soviet Union
- Four Policemen, called the Four Powers during World War II, the four major Allies: China, Soviet Union, United Kingdom, United States

== See also ==
- Five Power Defence Arrangements
