= List of Axis World War II conferences =

This is a list of World War II conferences of the Axis of World War II. For the historical context see Diplomatic history of World War II.

Name	City	Country	Dates	Major participants:	Major results
Gestapo–NKVD conferences	Multiple cities	Poland	September 1939 - March 1940	Gestapo and the NKVD officials	German–Soviet bilateral planning for Polish nationals in occupied territories
Salzburg Conference	Salzburg	Slovak State	July 28, 1940	Tiso, Hitler	Slovak capitulation to German demands
Berlin Pact Conference	Berlin	Nazi Germany	September 27, 1940	Representatives of Germany, Italy, and Japan	Signing of the Tripartite Pact.
Montoire Conference	Loir-et-Cher	Vichy France	October 24, 1940	Pétain and Hitler	French collaboration with Nazi Germany
Hendaye Conference	Hendaye	Vichy France	October 23, 1940	Franco, Hitler	Spain participation in the war.
Second German-Soviet Conference	Berlin	Nazi Germany	November 12-14, 1940	Molotov, Hitler and Ribbentrop	Failed attempt for Soviet Union to become a fourth Axis power
Mogilev Conference	Mogilev	Byelorussia	September 24–26, 1941	Schenckendorff, Bach-Zelewski, Nebe, Fegelein, Montua	Increase in atrocities by the Wehrmacht units against Jews and other civilians
Wannsee Conference	Wannsee	Nazi Germany	January 20, 1942	Heydrich, Hofmann, Müller	Wannsee Protocol
Tokyo Conference	Tokyo	Empire of Japan	November 5-6, 1943	Maw, Jinghui, Jingwei, Tōjō, Waithayakon, Laurel, and Bose	Joint Declaration by Greater East Asia Co-Prosperity Sphere

== See also ==
- List of Allied World War II conferences
