= Moscow Declarations =

Allied Powers' agreement in the wane of WWII

The Moscow Declarations were four declarations signed during the Moscow Conference on October 30, 1943. The declarations are distinct from the communique that was issued following the Moscow Conference of 1945. They were signed by the foreign secretaries of the governments of the United States, the United Kingdom, the Soviet Union and the Republic of China. Four declarations were signed at the conference: The Declaration of the Four Nations on General Security, the Declaration on Italy, the Declaration on Austria, and the Declarations on Atrocities.

== Declarations ==
=== Declaration of the Four Nations on General Security ===
In the section Joint Four-Nation Declaration, the governments of the United States of America, United Kingdom, the Soviet Union, and China, in accordance with the declaration by United Nations of January 1942, and subsequent declarations, agree to continue hostilities against those Axis powers with which they respectively are at war until such powers have laid down their arms on the basis of unconditional surrender. They also recognize the necessity of establishing at the earliest practicable date a general international organization (the United Nations), based on the principle of the sovereign equality of all peace-loving states, and open to membership by all such states, large and small, for the maintenance of international peace and security.

=== Declaration on Italy ===
In the Declaration on Italy, the foreign secretaries of the US, UK and USSR declared that fascism and its influence should be completely destroyed and that the Italian people should be given every opportunity to establish governmental and other institutions based on democratic principles.

=== Declaration on Austria ===
In the Declaration on Austria, the Foreign Secretaries of US, UK and USSR declared that the annexation (Anschluss) of Austria by Germany was null and void. It called for the establishment of a free Austria after the victory over Nazi Germany.

"The governments of the United Kingdom, the Soviet Union and the United States of America are agreed that Austria, the first free country to fall a victim to Hitlerite aggression, shall be liberated from German domination."

"They regard the annexation imposed upon Austria by Germany on March 15, 1938, as null and void. They consider themselves as in no way bound by any changes effected in Austria since that date. They declare that they wish to see re-established a free and independent Austria and thereby to open the way for the Austrian people themselves, as well as those neighbouring states which will be faced with similar problems, to find that political and economic security which is the only basis for lasting peace."

"Austria is reminded, however that she has a responsibility, which she cannot evade, for participation in the war on the side of Hitlerite Germany, and that in the final settlement account will inevitably be taken of her own contribution to her liberation."

=== Declaration on Atrocities ===
The Declaration on Atrocities was signed by the U.S. President Franklin D. Roosevelt, British Prime Minister Winston Churchill and Soviet Premier Joseph Stalin. They noted that "evidence of atrocities, massacres and cold-blooded mass executions which are being perpetrated by Hitlerite forces in many of the countries they have overrun and from which they are now being steadily expelled". They went on to state that Germans would be sent back to the countries where they had committed their crimes and "judged on the spot by the peoples whom they have outraged". As for those Germans whose criminal offenses had no particular geographical localization, they would be punished by joint decision of the governments of the Allies.

The Statement on Atrocities was largely drafted by Winston Churchill, and led to the setting up of the European Advisory Commission which drafted the London Charter.

== See also ==
- Diplomatic history of World War II
- History of the United Nations
- List of Allied World War II conferences
