= List of Allied World War II conferences =

This is a list of World War II conferences of the Allies of World War II. Names in boldface indicate the three conferences at which the leaders of the United States, the United Kingdom, and the Soviet Union were all present. For the historical context see Diplomatic history of World War II. See also the Anglo-French Supreme War Council, which operated from September 1939 until June 1940.

Name (CODE NAME)	City	Country	Dates	Major participants:	Major results
U.S.-British Staff Conference (ABC-1)	Washington, D.C.	United States	January 29 – March 27, 1941	American, British, and Canadian military staff	Set the basic planning agreement for the U.S. to enter the war.
First Inter-Allied Conference	London	United Kingdom	June 12, 1941	Representatives of Britain, 4 Dominions, Free France and 8 Allied governments in exile	Declaration of St James's Palace.
Atlantic Conference (RIVIERA)	Argentia	Newfoundland	August 9–12, 1941	Churchill and Roosevelt	Atlantic Charter; proposal for a Soviet aid conference.
Second Inter-Allied Conference	London	United Kingdom	September 24, 1941	Eden, Maisky, Cassin, and 8 Allied governments in exile	Adherence of all the Allies to the Atlantic Charter principles.
First Moscow Conference (CAVIAR)	Moscow	Soviet Union	September 29 – October 1, 1941	Stalin, Harriman, Beaverbrook, Molotov	Allied aid to the Soviet Union.
First Washington Conference (ARCADIA)	Washington, D.C.	United States	December 22, 1941 – January 14, 1942	Churchill, Roosevelt	Europe first, Declaration by United Nations.
Third Inter-Allied Conference	London	United Kingdom	January 13, 1942	Free France and 8 Allied governments in exile: Belgium, Czechoslovakia, Greece, Luxembourg, the Netherlands, Norway, Poland (Sikorski), Yugoslavia	Declaration Punishment for War Crimes, regarding Nazi atrocities against civilians.
Second Washington Conference (ARGONAUT)	Washington, D.C.	United States	June 20 – 25, 1942	Churchill, Roosevelt	Make first priority opening a second front in North Africa, postpone cross-English Channel invasion.
Second Claridge Conference	London	United Kingdom	July 20 – 26, 1942	Churchill, Harry Hopkins	Substitute Operation Torch, the invasion of French North Africa, for US reinforcement of the Western Desert campaign.
Second Moscow Conference (BRACELET)	Moscow	Soviet Union	August 12 – 17, 1942	Churchill, Stalin, Harriman	Discuss reasons for Torch instead of cross-Channel invasion, Anglo-Soviet pact on information and technological exchanges.
Cherchell Conference	Cherchell	French Algeria	October 21 – 22, 1942	Clark, Vichy French officers including Mast	Clandestine conference before Torch, some Vichy French commanders agreed not to resist the Allied landings in Morocco and Algeria.
Casablanca Conference (SYMBOL)	Casablanca	French Morocco	January 14 – 24, 1943	Churchill, Roosevelt, de Gaulle, Giraud	Plan Italian Campaign, plan cross-Channel invasion in 1944, demand "unconditional surrender" by Axis, encourage unity of French authorities in London and Algiers.
Potenji River Conference	Natal	Brazil	January 28 – 29, 1943	Roosevelt, Vargas	Creation of the Brazilian Expeditionary Force.
Adana Conference	Yenice	Turkey	January 30 – 31, 1943	Churchill, İnönü	Turkey's participation in the war.
Bermuda Conference	Hamilton	Bermuda	April 19 – 30, 1943	American and British delegations separately led by Harold W. Dodds and Richard Law	Jewish refugees freed by Allied forces and those still in Nazi-occupied Europe discussed. US immigration quotas not raised, UK prohibition on Jews seeking refuge in Mandatory Palestine not lifted.
Third Washington Conference (TRIDENT)	Washington, D.C.	United States	May 12 – 25, 1943	Churchill, Roosevelt, Marshall	Plan Italian Campaign, increase air attacks on Germany, increase war in Pacific.
Algiers Allied Planning Conference	Algiers	Algeria	May 29 – June 4, 1943	Churchill, Eden, Brooke, Tedder, Cunningham, Alexander, & Montgomery met with Marshall & Eisenhower	Finalize plan for Italian Campaign, increase air attacks on Germany, fix date for Operation Husky.
First Quebec Conference (QUADRANT)	Quebec City	Canada	August 17 – 24, 1943	Churchill, Roosevelt, King	D-Day set for 1944, reorganization of South East Asia Command, secret Quebec Agreement to limit sharing nuclear energy info.
Third Moscow Conference	Moscow	Soviet Union	October 18 – November 11, 1943	Foreign ministers Hull, Eden, Molotov, Fu; and Stalin	Moscow Declaration.
Cairo Conference (SEXTANT)	Cairo	Kingdom of Egypt	November 23 – 26, 1943	Churchill, Roosevelt, Chiang	Cairo Declaration for postwar Asia.
**Tehran Conference** (EUREKA)	Tehran	Persia	November 28 – December 1, 1943	Churchill, Roosevelt, Stalin	First meeting of the Big 3, plan the final strategy for the war against Nazi Germany and its allies, set date for Operation Overlord.
Second Cairo Conference	Cairo	Kingdom of Egypt	December 4 – 6, 1943	Churchill, Roosevelt, İnönü	Agreement to complete Allied air bases in Turkey, postpone Operation Anakim against Japan in Burma.
British Commonwealth Prime Ministers' Conference	London	United Kingdom	May 1–16, 1944	Churchill, Curtin, Fraser, King, and Smuts	British Commonwealth leaders support Moscow Declaration and reach agreement regarding their respective roles in the overall Allied war effort.
Bretton Woods Conference	Bretton Woods	United States	July 1 – 15, 1944	Representatives of 44 nations	Establishes International Monetary Fund and International Bank for Reconstruction and Development.
Dumbarton Oaks Conference	Washington, D.C.	United States	August 21 – 29, 1944	Cadogan, Gromyko, Stettinius, and Koo	Agreement to establish the United Nations.
Second Quebec Conference (OCTAGON)	Quebec City	Canada	September 12 – 16, 1944	Churchill, Roosevelt	Morgenthau Plan for postwar Germany, other war plans, Hyde Park Agreement.
Fourth Moscow Conference (TOLSTOY)	Moscow	Soviet Union	October 9 – 18, 1944	Churchill, Stalin, Molotov, Eden	Establishing post-war spheres of influence in Eastern Europe and Balkan peninsula.
Malta Conference (ARGONAUT and CRICKET)	Floriana	Crown Colony of Malta	January 30 – February 2, 1945	Churchill, Roosevelt	Preparation for Yalta.
**Yalta Conference** (ARGONAUT and MAGNETO)	Yalta	Soviet Union	February 4 – 11, 1945	Churchill, Roosevelt, Stalin	Final plans for defeat of Germany, postwar Europe plans, set date for United Nations Conference, conditions for the Soviet Union's entry in war against Japan.
United Nations Conference on International Organization	San Francisco	United States	April 25 – June 26, 1945	Representatives of 50 nations	United Nations Charter.
**Potsdam Conference** (TERMINAL)	Potsdam	Allied-occupied Germany	July 17 – August 2, 1945	Stalin, Truman, Attlee, Churchill (in part, until election defeat of the Conservative Party)	Potsdam Declaration demanding unconditional surrender of Japan, Potsdam Agreement on policy for Germany.

In total Attlee attended 0.5 meetings, Churchill 16.5, de Gaulle 1, Roosevelt 12, Stalin 7, and Truman 1.

For some of the major wartime conference meetings involving Roosevelt and later Truman, the code names were words which included a numeric prefix corresponding to the ordinal number of the conference in the series of such conferences. The third conference was TRIDENT, the fourth conference was QUADRANT, the sixth conference was SEXTANT, and the eighth conference was OCTAGON. The last wartime conference was code-named TERMINAL.

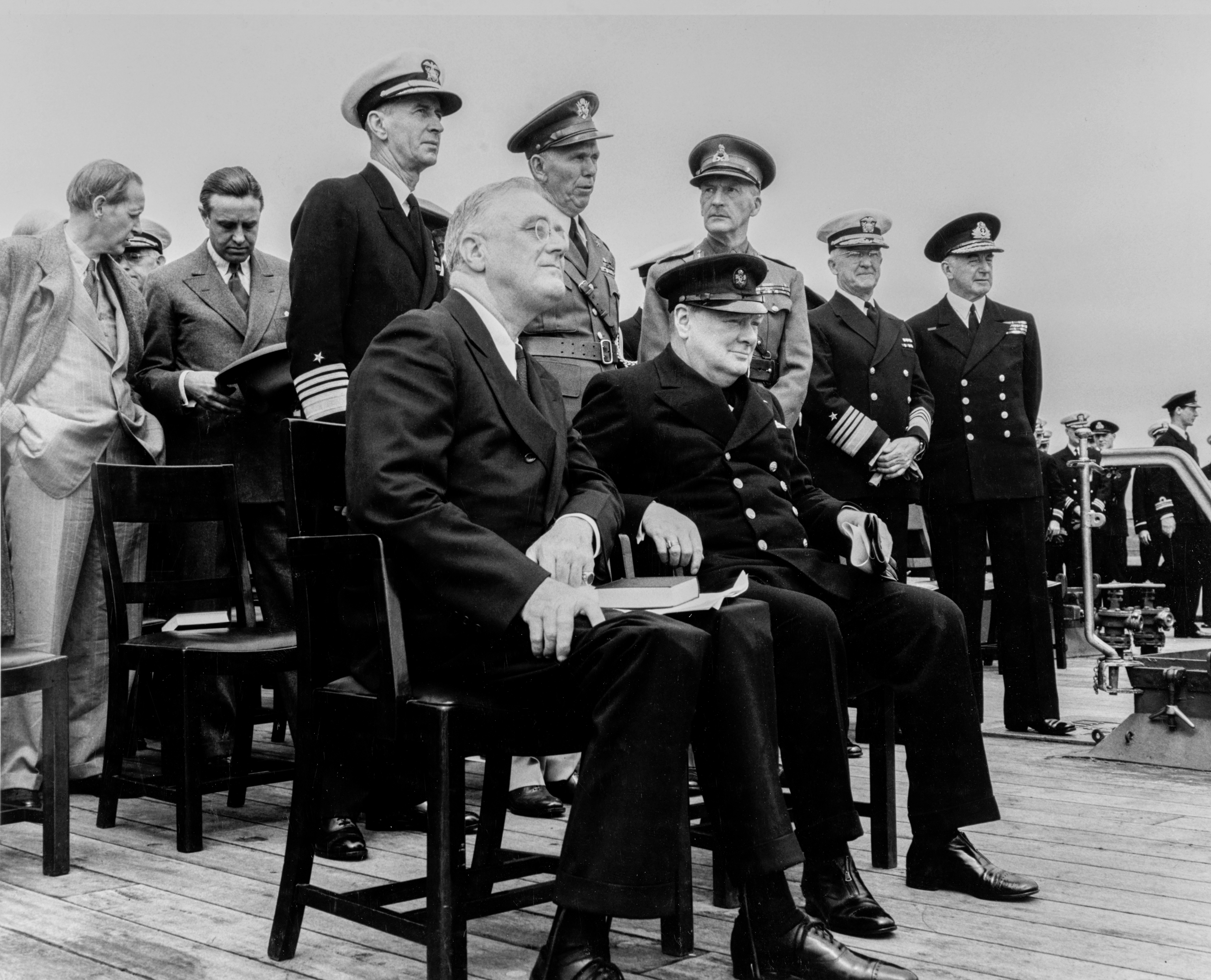
Atlantic Conference, Argentia, Dominion of Newfoundland, 1941

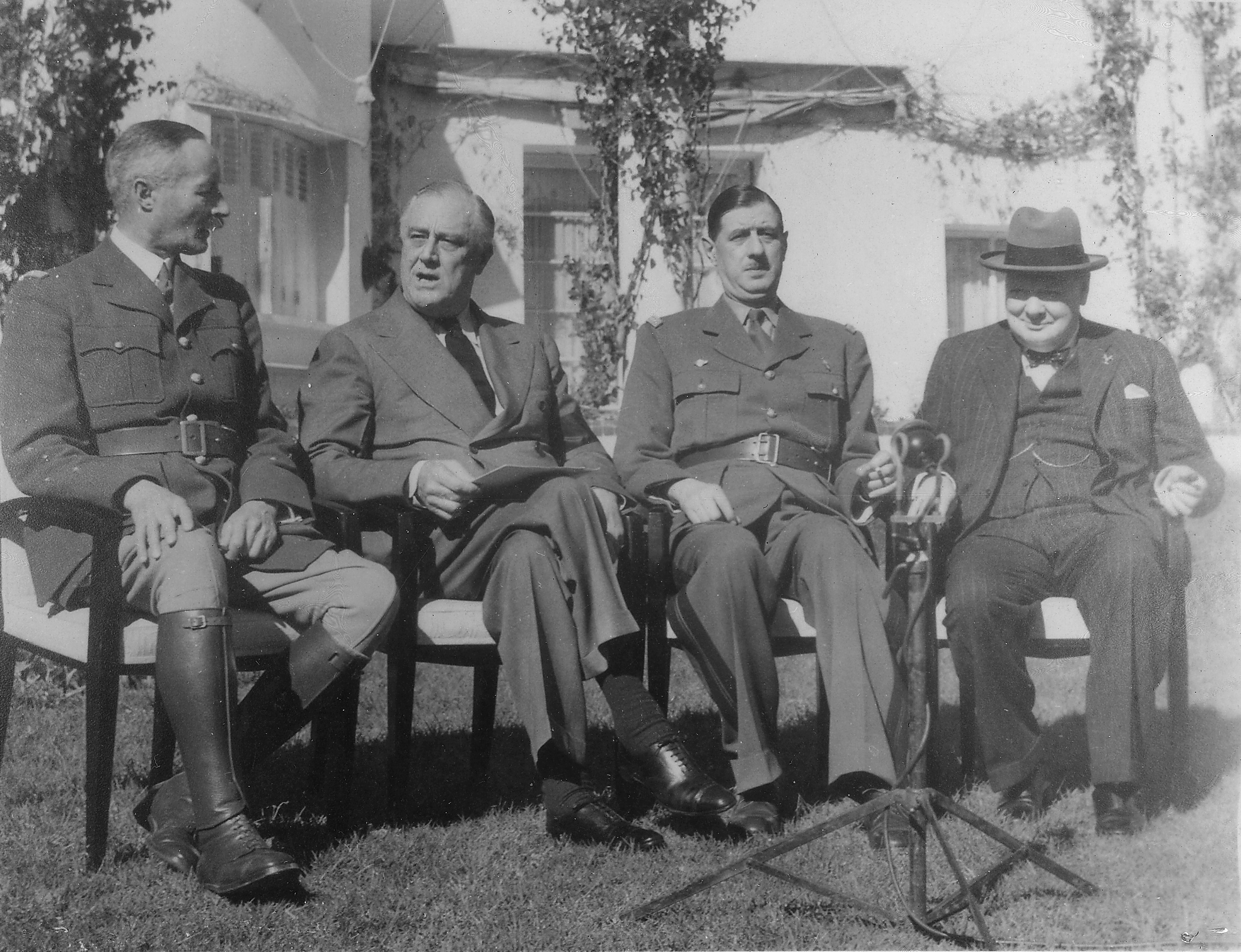
Casablanca Conference, Casablanca, Morocco, 1943

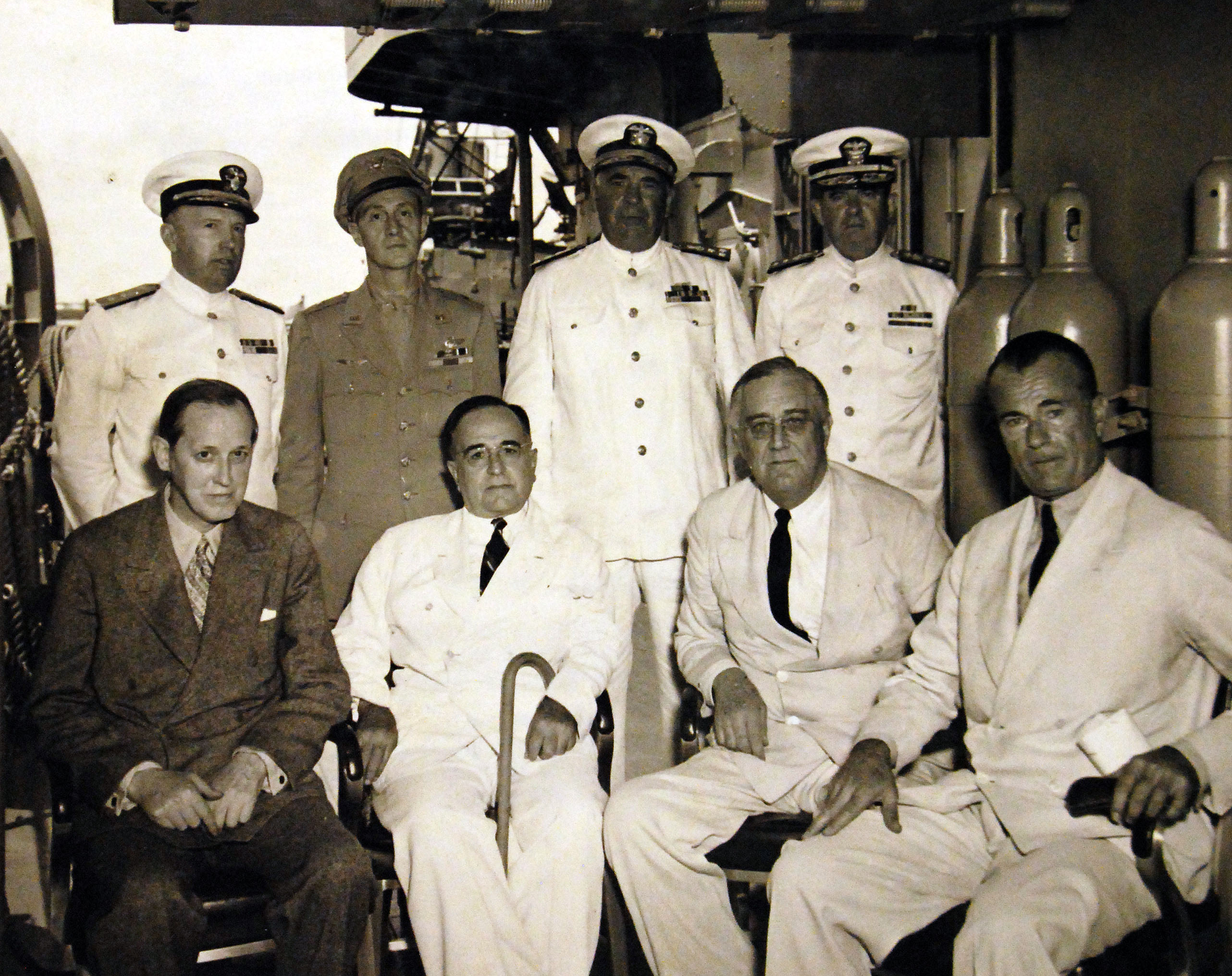
Potenji River Conference, Natal, Brazil, 1943

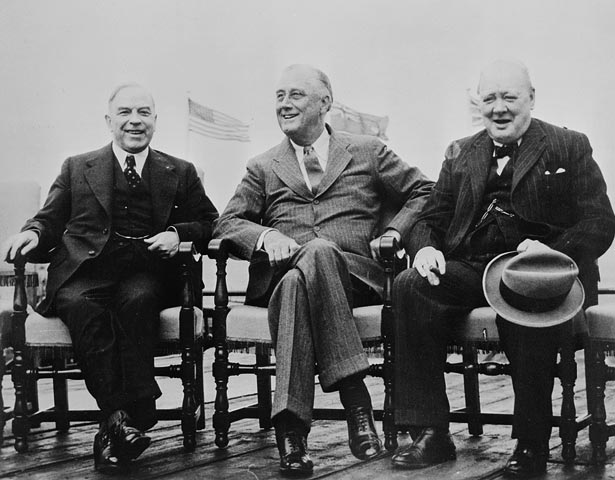
First Quebec Conference, Quebec City, Canada, 1943

Cairo Conference, Cairo, Egypt, 1943

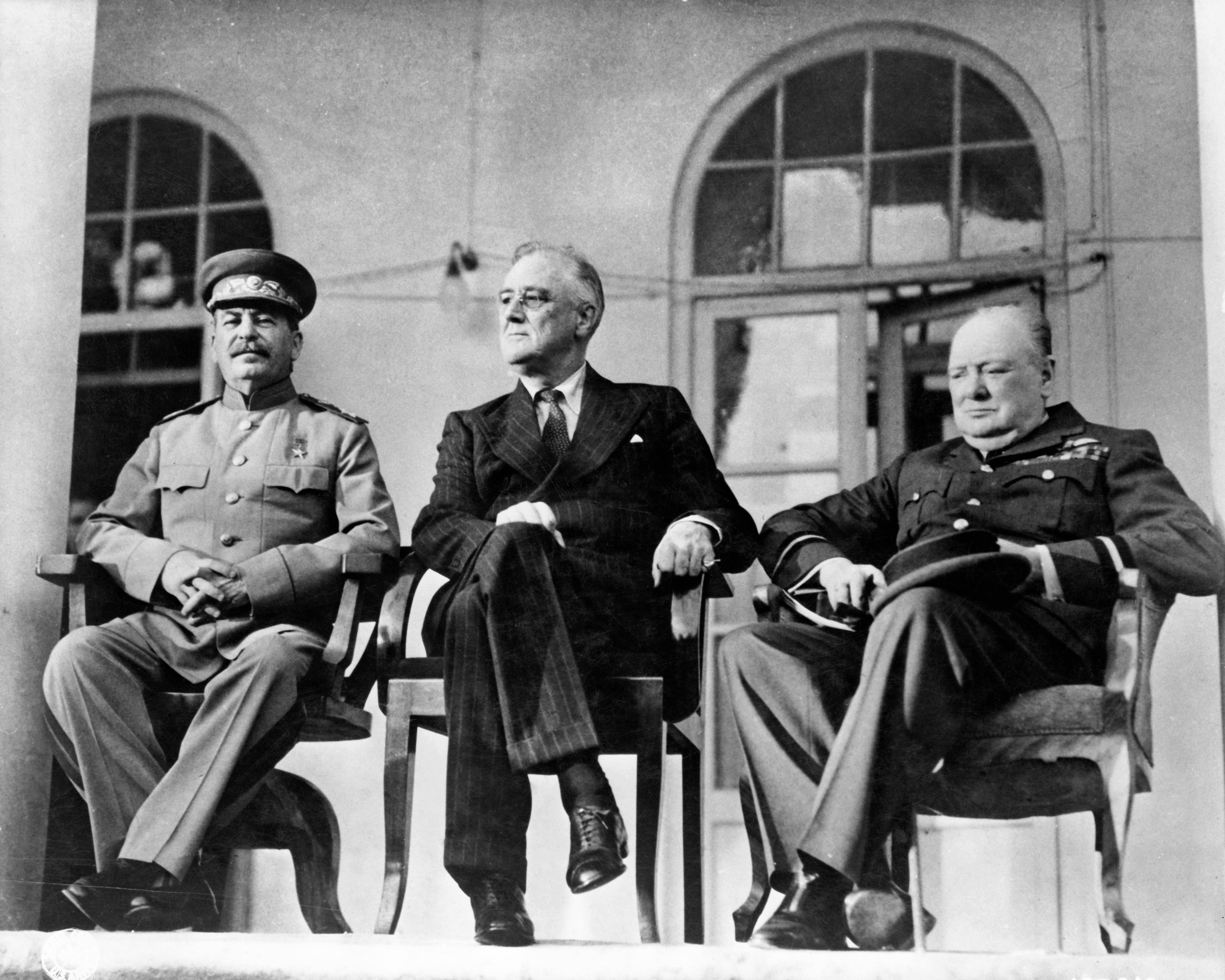
Tehran Conference, Tehran, Iran, 1943

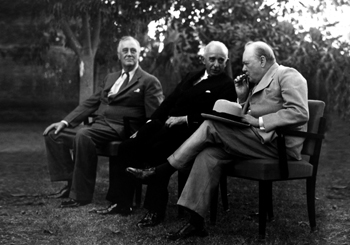
Second Cairo Conference, Cairo, Egypt, 1943

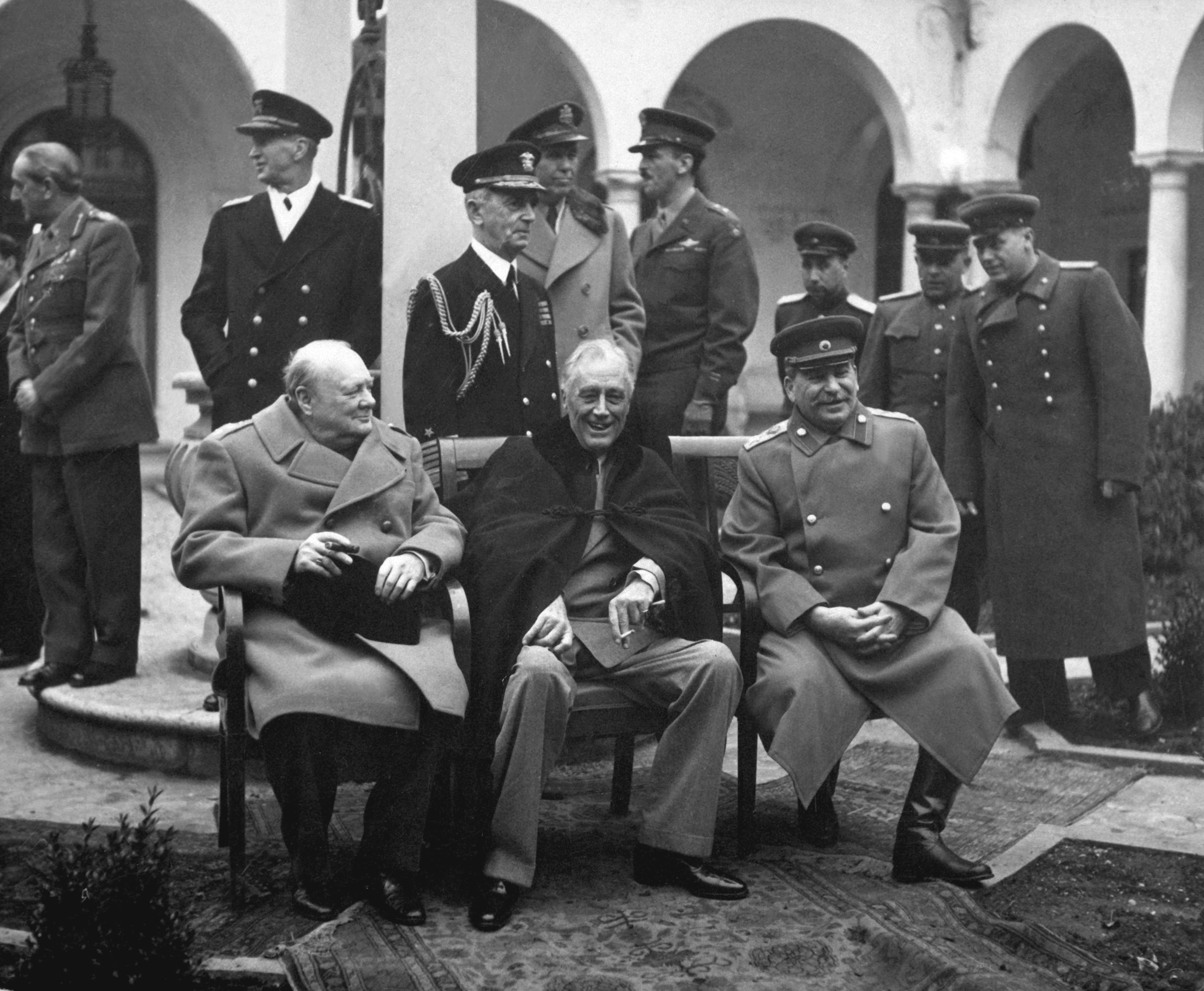
Yalta Conference, Yalta, USSR, 1945

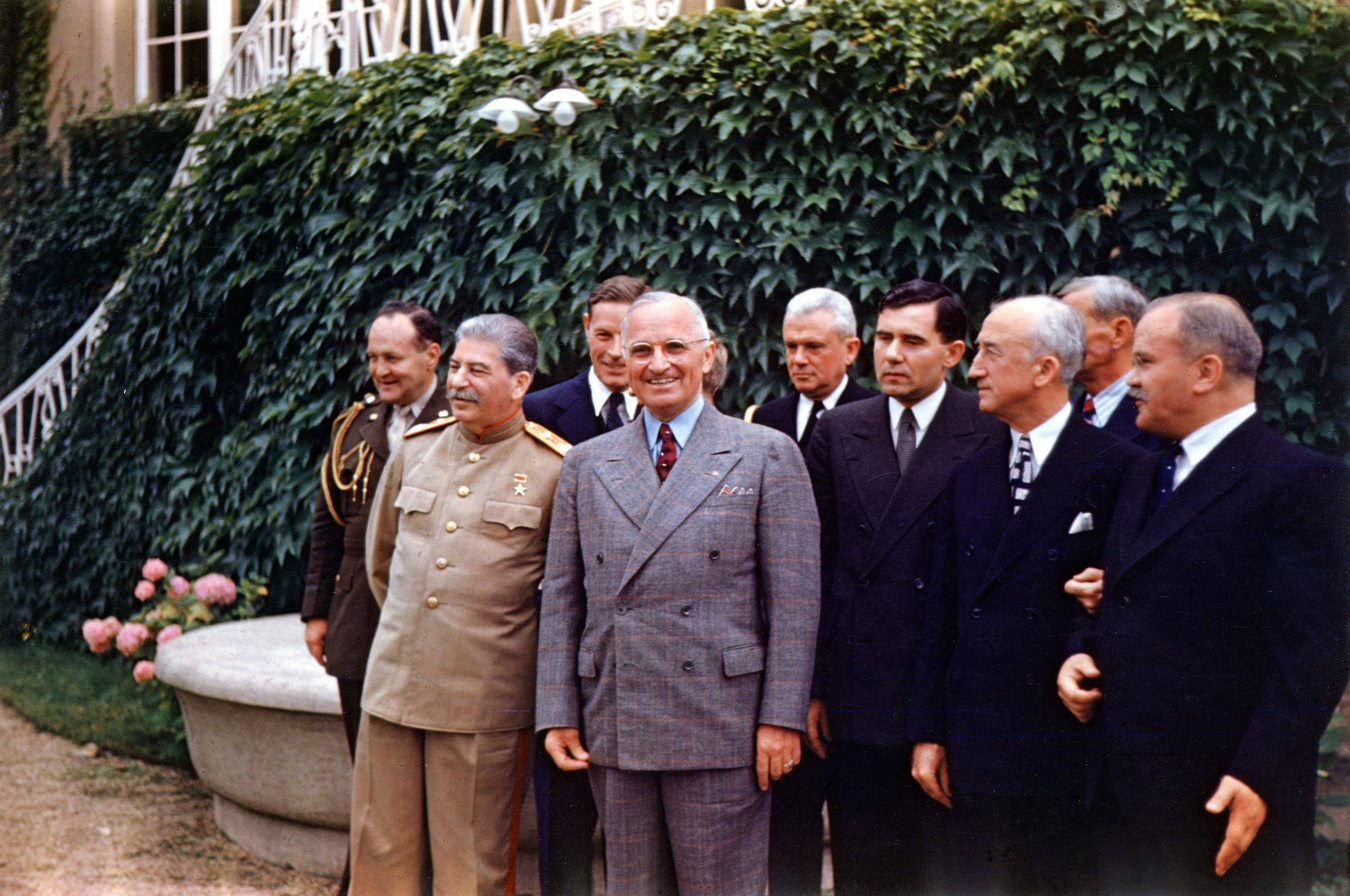
Potsdam Conference, Potsdam, Germany, 1945

== See also ==
- Allies of World War II
- Diplomatic history of World War II
- Grand Alliance (World War II)
- Four Policemen
- Greater East Asia Conference
- List of Axis World War II conferences
