= Morozova Mansion =

Neo-Gothic mansion in Moscow, Russia

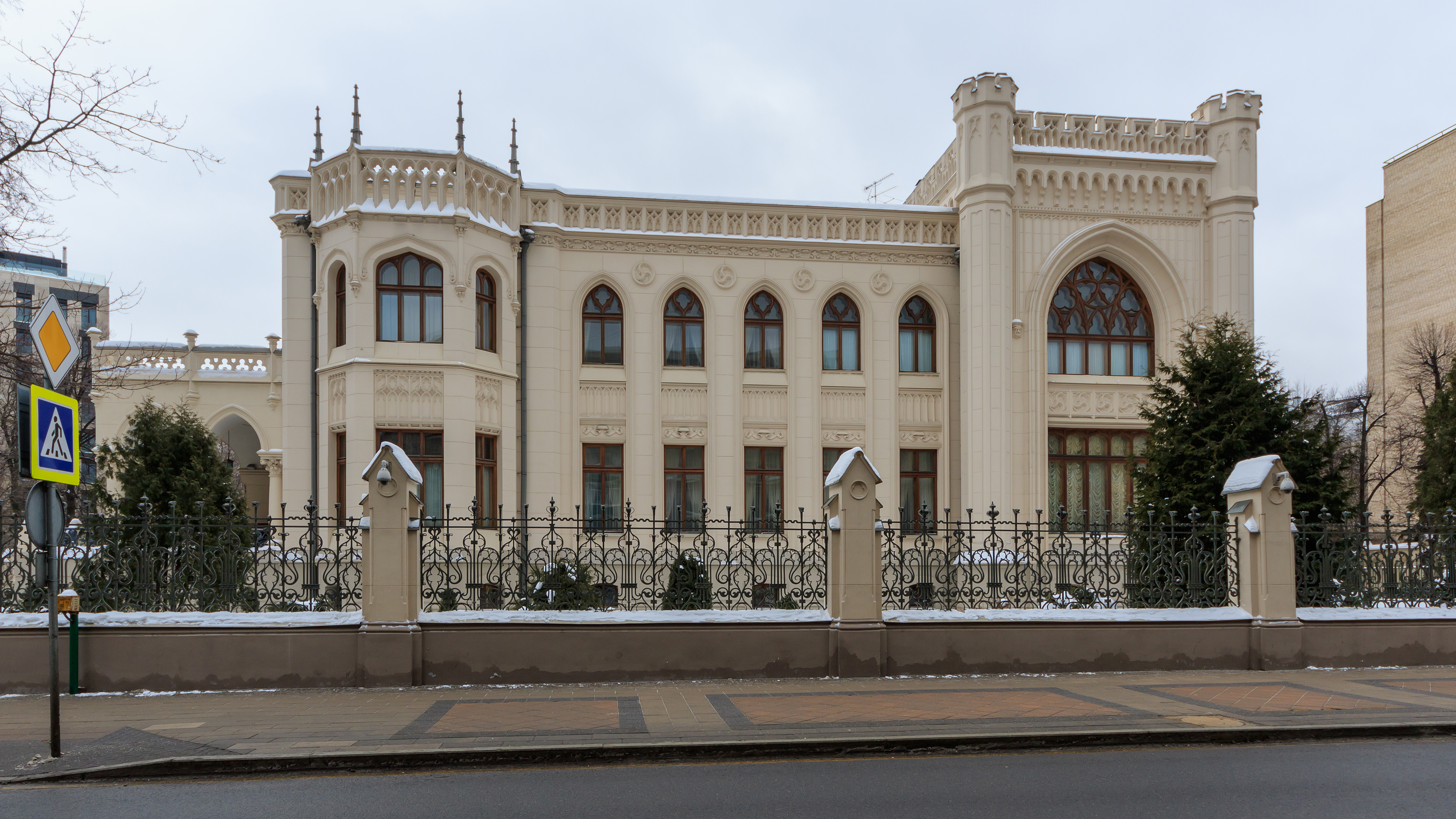
- Morozova Mansion
- Alternative names: Zinaida Morozova('s) Mansion or House; Morozov('s) Mansion or House; Morozova Palace; Spiridonovka Palace; Reception House of the Ministry of Foreign Affairs of the Russian Federation

General information
- Status: Cultural heritage of the peoples of the Russian Federation
- Type: Administrative
- Architectural style: Neo-Gothic
- Location: 17 Spiridonovka Street, Moscow, Russian Federation
- Coordinates: 55°45′41″N 37°35′29″E
- Year built: 1893–1898

Design and construction
- Architect: Fyodor Schechtel

The Morozova Mansion or Zinaida Morozova's Mansion (Russian: Особняк Зинаиды Морозовой), also known as the Morozova Palace or the Spiridonovka Palace, is a neo-Gothic building in the Presnensky District of Moscow, which belonged to Zinaida Grigoryevna Morozova, who was married to industrialist Savva Morozov. Built to the design of the architect Fyodor Schechtel, it has been the Reception House of the Ministry of Foreign Affairs of Russia since 1938.

The Morozovs bought the land on Spiridonovka Street in 1893; the mansion was completed by 1898, and Mikhail Vrubel was invited to decorate the interiors. After the death of Savva Morozov, Zinaida Morozova sold the estate to industrialist and philanthropist Mikhail Ryabushinsky, who was forced to emigrate in 1918. After the 1917 October Revolution, the state took over ownership of the mansion, and the building was transferred to the department of the People's Commissariat of Foreign Affairs, and later converted into the Reception House of the Ministry of Foreign Affairs of the Union of Soviet Socialist Republics. During the Second World War, the mansion hosted meetings of the foreign ministers of the United States, United Kingdom and the Soviet Union. In 1995, the mansion was seriously damaged by a major fire, but was restored using surviving drawings and photographs.

== History ==
=== Previous owners ===
The first mention of a house at 17 Spiridonovka Street dates to the mid-18th century. At that time, the land was larger and belonged to Privy Councillor Illarion Vorontsov. The main house was located in the depths of a large garden and was a classic city estate of the late 18th – early 19th centuries.

In 1812, the building and adjacent areas were severely damaged by the Moscow fire, and were later acquired by the poet and statesman Ivan Dmitriev. In 1814, he began construction of a new house and commissioned young architect Aleksandr Vitberg, who was simultaneously working on the design of the Cathedral of Christ the Saviour. The new building was erected on a stone foundation and had wooden floors, and the main decoration of the façade were two porticos with six columns each. During his life in Moscow, Dmitriev often received writer friends, such as Alexander Pushkin and Nikolai Gogol.

In 1842, the estate was purchased by Nikolai Timofeevich Aksakov, the brother of the writer and theatre critic Sergey Aksakov. The house became a meeting place for cultural and public figures, and Slavophile meetings were held here. Gradually, the owner sold off unused areas of the garden, and in 1893, the remaining part of the estate was acquired by Zinaida Grigoryevna Morozova, who was married to the philanthropist and industrialist Savva Morozov.

=== The Morozovs' mansion ===
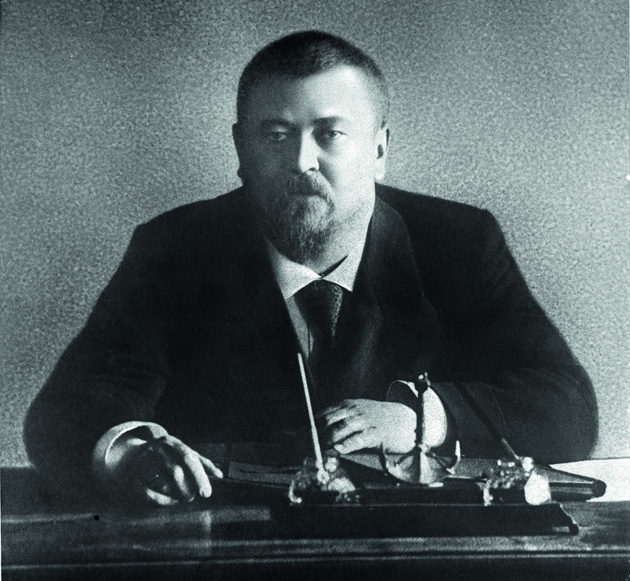
Savva Morozov (1862–1905)

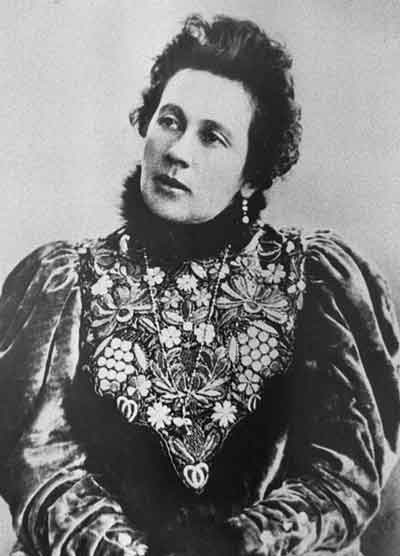
Zinaida Grigoryevna Morozova (1867–1947), late 19th century

When Savva Morozov became engaged to Zinaida Grigorievna, he promised to build a house of exceptional beauty, in honour of his wife. The Morozov family invited the young Fyodor Schechtel as architect. He had known Savva Morozov before and had already designed a wooden dacha on the Kirzhach river for him. The architect was popular among the merchant class, but this was the first time he had completed an order on such a scale. Schechtel had been expelled from the third year of the Moscow School of Painting, Sculpture and Architecture for regular truancy, so he did not have the right to construct buildings within the city limits. He had to take external exams in order to sign the drawings with his own name. In total, more than 600 drawings were completed for the project, including not only engineering plans, but also interior details and furniture sketches.

Even after successfully completing his studies, Schechtel did not have the right to independently supervise the work until January 1894, so Ivan Kuznetsov, who at that time served as his assistant, was listed as the project manager. Construction was able to begin without delay in the autumn of 1893, immediately after the city council approved the building plan in August. The architect wanted to create a harmonious image of Zinaida Morozova's estate, so he looked for an original and talented artist for the decorative design. The then little-known Mikhail Vrubel became the artist. Together they worked on the estate for four years, and in 1898 the construction was completed.

Having settled in the new mansion, Zinaida Morozova turned her home into a social salon and the centre of the city's cultural life. Morozova hosted public figures and the creative intelligentsia: here one could meet Sergei Witte, Grand Duchess Elizabeth Feodorovna of Russia, Anton Chekhov, Vladimir Nemirovich-Danchenko, Isaac Levitan, Alexander Benois, and Feodor Chaliapin, who often performed in the mansion for a narrow group of people. Prince Sergei Shcherbatov recalled the receptions as follows:

Such an interesting phenomenon was the newly built palace of enormous size and unusually luxurious in the Anglo-Gothic style on Spiridonovka... The hostess, Zinaida Grigoryevna Morozova, a great mind, with innate tact, all hung with marvellous pearls, received guests with truly royal grandeur.

Unlike his wife, Savva Morozov considered the Nikolskaya manufactory his real home. He rarely attended social events and spent most of his evenings in his study. Maxim Gorky, who often visited Morozov, the sponsor of his theatre, described the family's life as follows:

In Savva's study, everything is modest and simple... behind the study is the bedroom; both rooms, with their discomfort, gave the impression of a bachelor's home. And downstairs... in all the rooms there are many rich things of a varied nature and the same purpose: to prevent a person from moving freely.

Carried away by the ideas of the liberal movement, Morozov allowed meetings of the constitutionalist zemstvo members to be held in his house and hid from the police the revolutionary Nikolai Bauman, who slept in his billiard room. The patron of the arts admitted that during one of these overnight stays, he was visited by the Moscow mayor Anatoly Reinbot.

=== Nationalisation ===
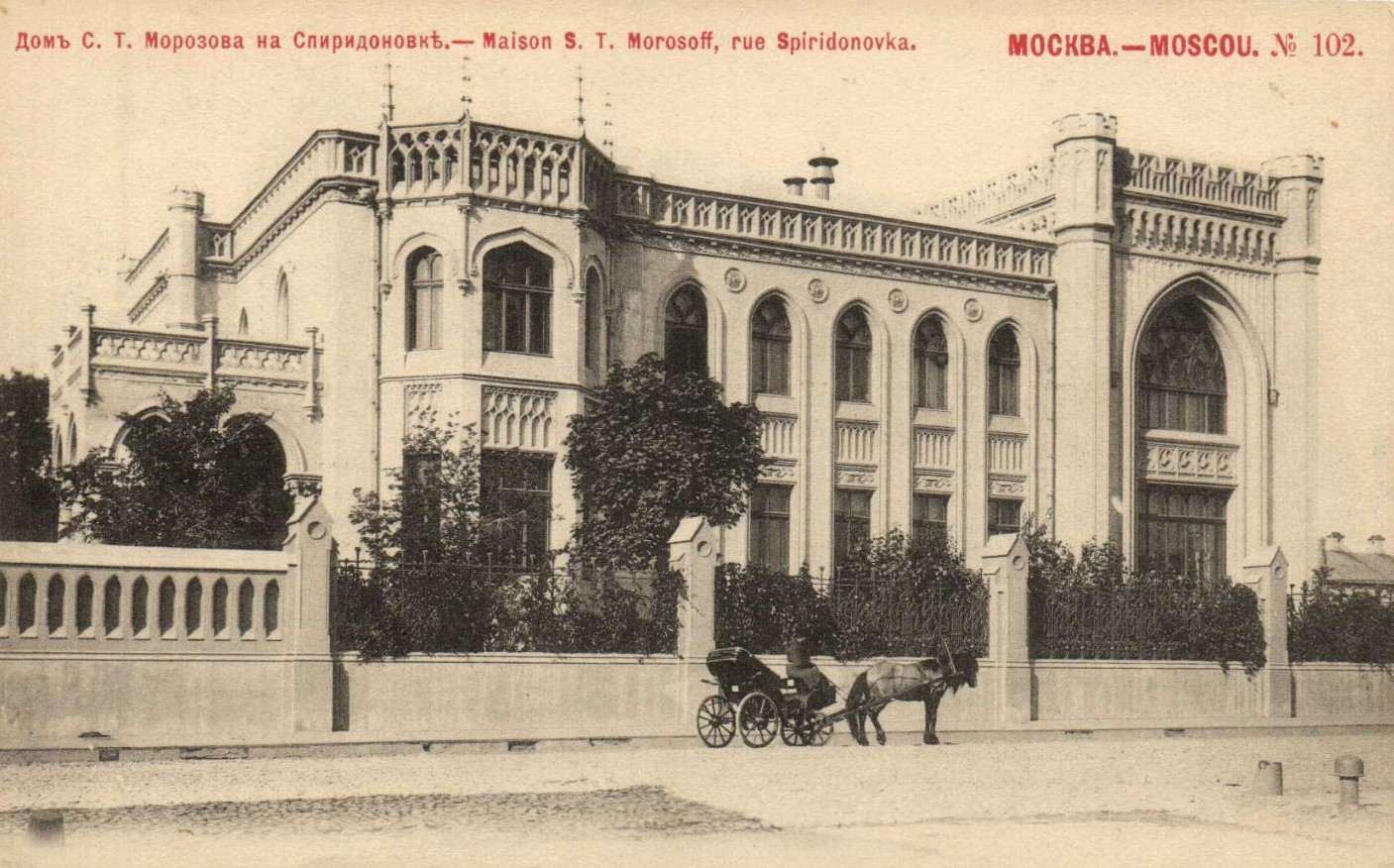
The façade of the Morozova Mansion (c. 1902)

After her husband's death, Morozova no longer wished to stay in the luxurious mansion, and in 1909 the estate was purchased by businessman and philanthropist Mikhail Ryabushinsky, who wanted to live near his brother Stepan Ryabushinsky. An art collector, Mikhail Ryabushinsky remodelled the house so that it could conveniently accommodate a collection of paintings by Russian and foreign artists: Alexandre Benois, Pierre Renoir, Camille Pissarro, Edgar Degas, and others. The new owner decided to update the interior and invited the artist Konstantin Bogaevsky for this, who complemented Vrubel's work with three panels: "Distance", "Sun" and "Rock". In 1916, Ryabushinsky's wife Tatyana Fominishna gave birth to a daughter, Tatyana, who became a ballerina. The family did not live in the house for long and emigrated from the country after the 1917 revolution. Mikhail Ryabushinsky gave part of his extensive collection to the Tretyakov Gallery for safekeeping, and hid the rest within the walls of the mansion, waiting for a quick return.

After the revolution, the mansion was nationalised and the Provincial Food Committee was located there. On 8 December 1918, at a meeting of the Moscow Congress of Soviets, Vladimir Lenin spoke here with a speech about the fight against the kulaks and food speculation.

In the 1920s, the mansion housed an orphanage for refugees from Bucharest, and the wing housed the Joseph Stalin Uzbek Institute of Education. During the redevelopment, Ryabushinsky's treasure was discovered in a hiding place behind a cabinet; it contained paintings by Pavel Brullov, Vasily Tropinin, Valentin Serov, Mikhail Vrubel, Ilya Repin, a marble bust of Victor Hugo by Auguste Rodin, and expensive oriental porcelain. In 1929, the building was transferred to the People's Commissariat of Foreign Affairs, and for nine years the building served as a residential building for People's Commissar Maxim Litvinov.

=== Reception House of the Ministry of Foreign Affairs ===
In 1938, the house became a reception building for foreign delegations, and repeatedly hosted meetings of the country's top officials. One of the significant events was the signing of the Moscow Declarations in 1943. The conference, which was a prerequisite for the creation of the UN, was attended by the foreign ministers of the United States, United Kingdom, and the Soviet Union. Winston Churchill and Josef Stalin also met at the mansion in October 1944 to negotiate post-war 'spheres of influence'. In 1963, an agreement banning nuclear weapons testing in the atmosphere, space, and underwater was adopted within the walls of the mansion. In 2015, a memorial plaque was unveiled on the wall of the house, commemorating these events.

By order of Foreign Minister Andrei Gromyko, a large-scale reconstruction of the historical interiors of the mansion building took place from 1973 to 1987. During the work, Yevgeny Konstantinovich Baikov, appointed director of the Reception House of the Ministry of Foreign Affairs, independently searched for suitable furniture, paintings, and dishes in antique stores. He noted that at the beginning of the restoration the building was in an extremely poor condition:

The walls and ceilings were covered with a thick crust of whitewash – later, when cleaning, we counted either 17 or 19 layers. It turned out that this is how many times J. V. Stalin visited the mansion. Each time, a few days before his visit, a team of fine painters would come and carefully whitewash the walls and ceilings. They would cover everything – fresco paintings, gilding, stucco... The furniture was terrible – government desks, old leather chairs...

After the restoration was completed, the Ministry of Foreign Affairs staff prepared and published an album showing the restored interiors of the state rooms. In August 1995, a serious fire occurred in the building, which destroyed 70% of the interior of the house. The most severe damage was done to the anteroom and the main staircase, and works by Vrubel and Bogaevsky were lost. The complete restoration of the house took the entire following year, and the interior was restored using photographs and surviving drawings by Fyodor Schechtel. In 1996, the Moscow Summit on Nuclear Safety and Security special meeting of the G7 countries plus Russia was held here.

== Recent history ==
Zinaida Morozova's mansion remains the centre of the city's political and social life. International conferences and meetings are regularly held here. In March 2008, the building was visited by United States Secretary of State Condoleezza Rice and the Pentagon chief Robert Gates, and in April 2017, by US Secretary of State Rex Tillerson. The palace's state rooms are also a venue for presentations of economic forums and fashion shows. In 2015, Zinaida Morozova's mansion was included in the list of museums participating in the days of historical and cultural heritage. The mansion is designated a Cultural Heritage Site of Federal Significance and is managed by GlavUpDK, the Main Administration for Service to the Diplomatic Corps, part of the Russian Ministry of Foreign Affairs.

== Architecture ==
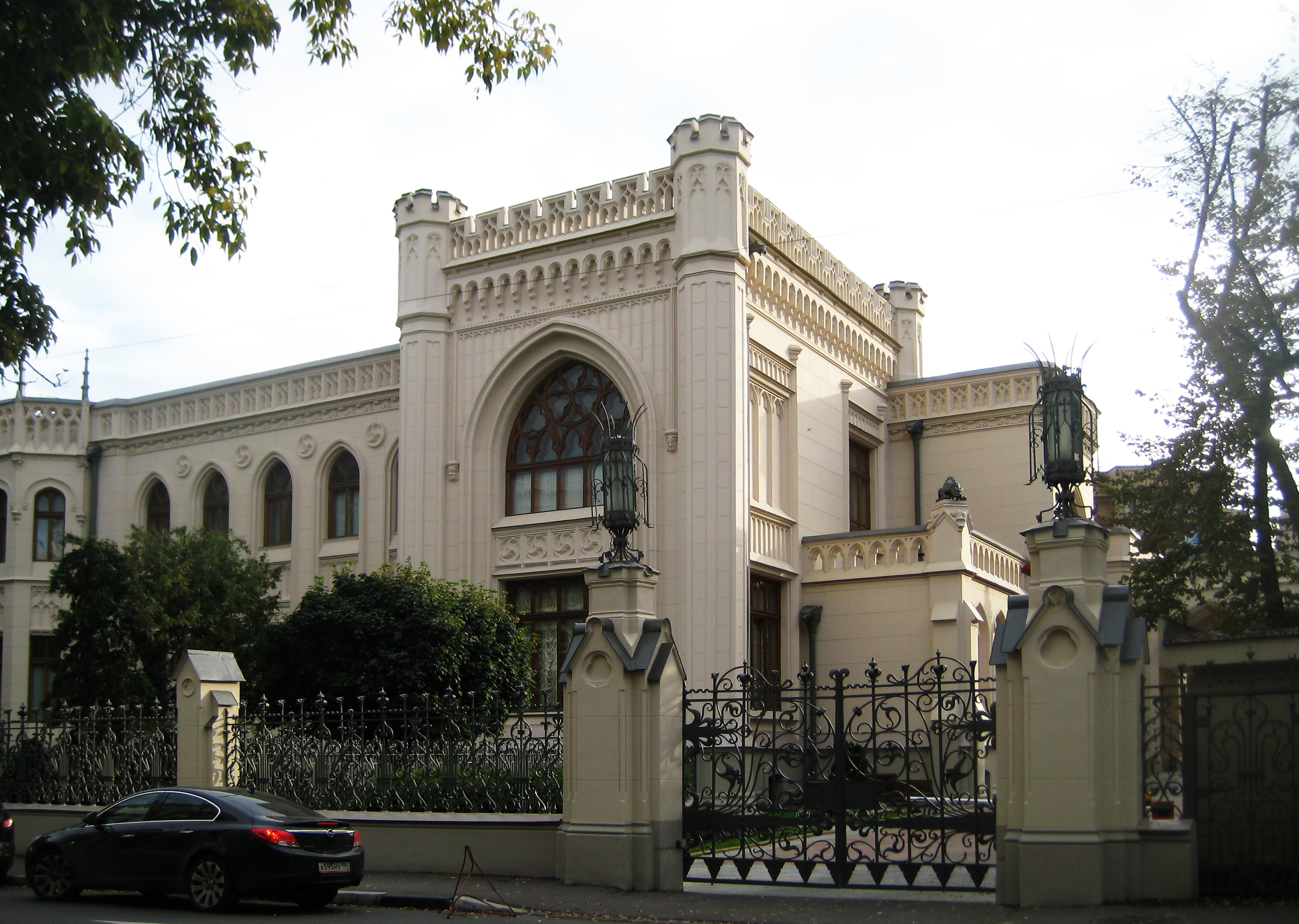
Side façade of Zinaida Morozova's mansion, 2012

=== Features of the façade ===
After graduating from university, Savva Morozov went to study manufacturing in Great Britain. He was amazed by the English neo-Gothic cathedrals and in 1893 he conceived the idea of building his own house in the same style. At that time, Fyodor Schechtel was fond of medieval motifs and was able to bring his client's wishes to life.

According to the architect's vision, all the charm of the estate is revealed in its dynamics. Zinaida Morozova's mansion became the first object of urban architecture since the time of Peter the Great, to be distinguished by the artistic expressiveness of all the façades. From any angle, the complex creates a harmonious picturesque image, which appear due to the different parts of the building in shape and architectural rhythm. Despite the external differences, some art historians note the similarity of this composition with the design of ancient Russian mansions, one of the main features of which was the correspondence of the interior spaces to external independent volumes.

As in other works by Schechtel, the estate has a stylistic centre that creates the overall integrity of the façade. In the Morozova mansion, it is a two-story tower with massive window openings. Another artistic technique aimed at creating overall coherence is the rhythmic repetition of details. The perception of each object, be it a staircase, a terrace or a buttress, is enhanced by a related detail. Thus, due to the square volumes on the right side of the building, the main tower looks more harmonious and majestic.

In order not to distract the viewers' views from the spatial arrangement of objects, Schechtel abandoned massive decorative elements. The main artistic expressiveness is taken on by the window openings. The architect focused on the rhythmic arrangement and shape of the windows themselves, the size and appearance of which differ on different façades.

=== Layout and interiors ===
Fyodor Schechtel rejected the enfilade layout accepted at that time. The architect arranged the rooms of the house around the spatial core of the building, which is the vestibule and the antechamber; their dimensions became exemplary in the design of the entire building. Upon entering the house, guests climbed the staircase, decorated with snakes and chimeras, into the light and spacious antechamber. On one side of it were the living rooms, and on the other, the grand staircase leading to the second floor and Savva Morozov's study. This arrangement of the rooms made the vertical direction of movement as significant as the horizontal, which was unusual for 19th-century interiors.

The architect entrusted the design of the neo-Gothic rooms to the artist Mikhail Vrubel. He decorated the small living room with three panels on the theme of "Times of Day", and for the main staircase he created a sculptural composition "Robert and the Nuns" and a stained glass window "Knight", which, according to the author's plan, was not located in the window opening, but in a special niche with lighting, which provided uniform illumination throughout the day. The interior of the mansion, in addition to the main rooms, is designed in the Rococo and Empire styles and is as diverse as the external decoration. There are also Renaissance and Rocaille halls. Particular importance is given to the fancy chandeliers. Schechtel's love for lighting fixtures was a consequence of his admiration for technical innovation.

Mikhail Ryabushinsky, having become the owner of the Morozova Mansion, decided to update the interior of the large living room, for which he hired the artist Bogaevsky, who painted three panels on the theme of Crimean landscapes, thereby enhancing the imagery and sublimity of Vrubel's neo-Gothic interiors.

== Mansion in art ==
In 2017, the walls of the house were used for filming the war film To Paris. The creators of the film chose the mansion because of its architectural features and the similarity of its façade to German palaces. The mansion has been described as a palazzo and a "Moscow miracle", and the actor Mikhail Sadovsky composed a caustic epigram:

This castle evokes many thoughts,
I involuntarily felt sorry for the past:
Where the Russian mind once reigned,
Factory ingenuity now reigns.

Some admirers of Mikhail Bulgakov's work believe that the heroine of the novel The Master and Margarita lived in Morozova's castle, but most literary scholars do not share this point of view. Maxim Gorky described the house on Spiridonovka in his essay "Savva Morozov".

== See also ==
- Arseny Morozov House

== Literature ==
- Behnam, Pedram (2004), Принципы реставрации декора интерьеров и памятников [Principles of Restoration of Interior Decor and Monuments] (in Russian), Russian State Library (Российская государственная библиотека
- Kormilitsyna, N. V. (2008), Морозовы и Москва [The Morozovs and Moscow], Современные проблемы сервиса и туризма [Modern Problems of Service and Tourism] (in Russian), pp. 49–52
- Kirichenko, E. I. (2011), Ф. О. Шехтель. Жизнь. Образы. Идеи [F. O. Schechtel. Life. Images. Ideas] (in Russian), Moscow: Traditsiya (Традиция), ISBN 978-5-89826-374-4
- Sinegubov, S. N. (1999), История государства Российского. Жизнеописания. XX век [History of the Russian State: Biographies, XX century] (in Russian), vol. 6, Moscow: Knizhnaya Palata (Книжная палата), pp. 428–441, ISBN 5-7000-0462-3
