= European Advisory Commission =

Commission set up by the Allies during WW2

The formation of the European Advisory Commission (EAC) was agreed on at the Moscow Conference on 30 October 1943 between the foreign ministers of the United Kingdom, Anthony Eden, the United States, Cordell Hull, and the Soviet Union, Vyacheslav Molotov, and confirmed at the Tehran Conference in November. In anticipation of the defeat of Nazi Germany and its allies this commission was to study the postwar political problems in Europe and make recommendation to the three governments, including the surrender of the European enemy states and the machinery of its fulfillment. After the EAC completed its task it was dissolved at the Potsdam Conference in August 1945.

== 1944 ==
The EAC had its seat in London at Lancaster House and started its work on 14 January 1944. William Strang was the British delegate, while on the American and Soviet sides the respective ambassadors were the delegates John G. Winant and Fedor Tarasovich Gusev. The American military advisor was Cornelius Wendell Wickersham. George F. Kennan was a member of the American delegation in 1944.

At the Tehran Conference it was decided to hand over a large portion of German territory to Poland with the Oder–Neisse line as the eastern border of post-war Germany, and discussion about a possible partition of Germany were initiated by Roosevelt. Based on these premises, the EAC worked out the following recommendations during 1944:

- Partition of Germany into three occupied zones, each controlled by one power.
- Creation of the Allied Control Council (ACC)
- The ACC could only act in consensus.
- Partition of Berlin in three sectors.
- Separation of Austria which would also undergo a tripartite occupation, and Vienna to be occupied by three powers.
- Establishment of an Allied Commission for Austria.
- Draft instructions for the "unconditional surrender of Germany"
- Proposals for control machinery for administration.
- Establishment of an Allied Commission for Italy.

== 1945 ==
The work of the EAC was discussed at the Yalta Conference in 1945 where a major modification was approved as France received a seat on the ACC, and a future occupation zone in Germany was carved out from territory assigned to Great Britain and the United States. In addition, France received a future occupation zone in western Austria.

On 5 June 1945 the European Advisory Commission assumed briefly full control over Germany. Members included General Dwight Eisenhower for the US, Field Marshal Sir Bernard Montgomery for Britain, and Marshal Georgy Zhukov for the Soviet Union. The commission delimited German territory to its territory of 31 December 1937 minus territory handed over to Poland and the Soviet Union, divided Germany into four zones of occupation under American, British, French, and Soviet military administration and separately divided Berlin into four sectors. The Commission ceased to exist after the Potsdam Conference, and the ACC was nominally the highest power in Germany, while in reality, each occupied zone was ruled by the respective occupying power.

== Aftermath ==
The recommendations of the EAC shaped the development of postwar Europe. While it was by no means obvious at the Potsdam Conference that Germany would be partitioned into two states, the recommendations of the EAC allowed each occupying power full control over its occupied zone and deprived the ACC of an overruling influence. The subsequent Cold War thus was reflected in the partition of Germany as each occupying force could develop its zone on its own.

The EAC failed to be specific about length and terms of occupation and different zones underwent different occupation experiences. The Soviet-occupied zone suffered disproportionally from war reparations while the Western Zone benefited from stimulatory economic impacts such as the Marshall Plan.

Legally, the EAC ceased to function following the establishment of the Council of Foreign Ministers at the Potsdam Conference.

== See also ==
- Allied Occupation Zones in Germany
- Allied Control Council
- London Protocol (1944)
- Legal status of Germany
- Nuremberg Charter
