= Anglo-Soviet Treaty of 1942 =

1942 alliance between the United Kingdom and Soviet Union

Twenty-Year Mutual Assistance Agreement Between the United Kingdom and the Union of Soviet Socialist Republics Russian: Договор между СССР и Великобританией о союзе в войне против гитлеровской Германии и ее сообщников в Европе и о сотрудничестве и взаимной помощи после войны
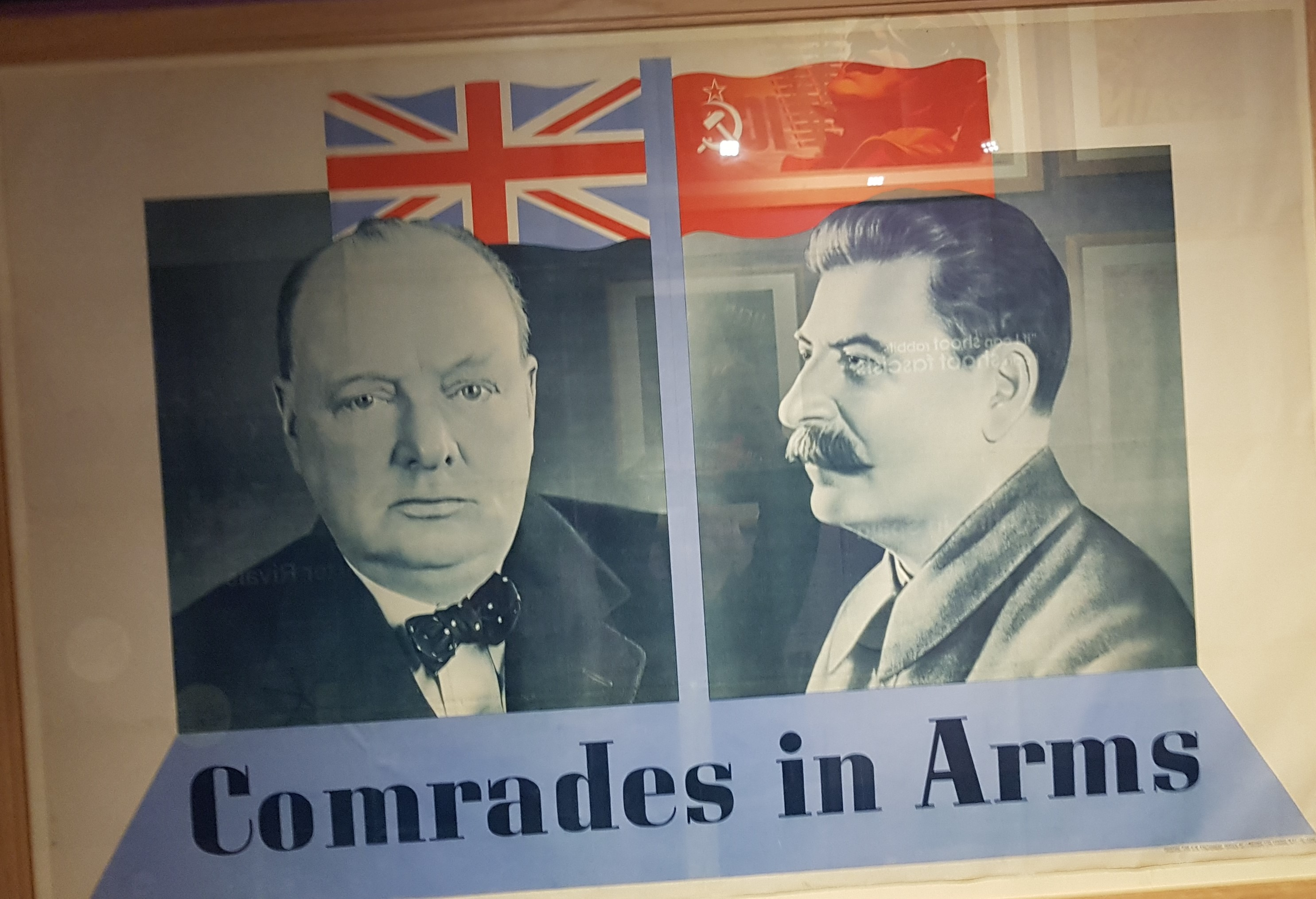
- 1942 British propaganda poster depicting Churchill and Stalin, bearing the caption "Comrades in Arms"
- Type: Military and political alliance
- Context: WWII
- Signed: 26 May 1942
- Location: London, United Kingdom
- Signatories: Anthony Eden; Vyacheslav Molotov
- Parties: United Kingdom; Soviet Union
- Languages: English; Russian

The Anglo-Soviet Treaty, formally the "Twenty-Year Mutual Assistance Agreement Between the United Kingdom and the Union of Soviet Socialist Republics", established a military and political alliance between the Soviet Union and the British Empire.

== Background ==
The Treaty followed on from the Anglo-Soviet Agreement of July 1941 that they would assist each other in fighting Germany and not seek a separate peace.

The first meeting to discuss the treaty took place on 15 December 1941, a week after the United States had joined the British Empire and the Soviet Union to oppose the Axis powers.

One of the goals of Joseph Stalin, the Soviet Union's head of government, was to establish a territorial agreement for a postwar Europe that would be largely divided between Britain and the Soviet Union.

During the treaty negotiations there was discussion of including a clause guaranteeing the Soviet Union its frontiers from the time when Germany had attacked her on 22 June 1941, the date when the invasion, Operation Barbarossa, had begun. Stalin hoped to regain the country's Nazi-occupied Soviet Republics of Ukraine and Belarus, and the additional territories that had been incorporated into the Soviet Union following the Molotov–Ribbentrop Pact of 1939. These included Moldavia and the Baltic states of Estonia, Latvia and Lithuania. Stalin also hoped to acquire Finland, which was at war with the Soviet Union as part of the Axis, and which had been an autonomous grand duchy of the Russian Empire. In exchange, he proposed that Britain would receive land and permission to have naval bases and maritime passage through the English Channel, the North Sea and the Baltic Sea. Britain and America were reluctant to guarantee the Soviet Union the territory it had acquired between 1939 and 1941, and Soviet negotiators had to abandon the idea. Britain made no territorial commitments and they did not form part of the agreement.

== Agreement ==
A military alliance was to last until the end of World War II, and a political alliance was to last 20 years. The treaty was signed in London on 26 May 1942 by British Foreign Secretary Anthony Eden and Soviet Foreign Minister Vyacheslav Molotov.

The treaty was bilateral. Absent from the discussions were the other Allies, including the United States, Canada, Australia, New Zealand, British India and the Republic of China. Also not represented were the Allies that had governments-in-exile, such as Czechoslovakia and France, whose countries were being occupied by Germany, despite the Soviets' initial aim being to direct those countries' postwar structure.

== Significance ==
The treaty represented a transition for Britain, which sacrificed some of its superpower status because of its weakened military state but still exerted diplomatic power during the negotiations.

Despite the Allies winning the war against the Axis powers, and the successful creation of the United Nations, the alliance of the Soviet Union with the United Kingdom and the United States ultimately broke down and evolved into the Cold War, which took place over the following half-century.

== See also ==
- Anglo-Soviet invasion of Iran
- Anglo-Soviet relations
- Declaration by United Nations
- Diplomatic history of World War II
- History of the United Nations
- Percentages agreement
