= Diplomatic history of World War II =

The diplomatic history of World War II includes the major foreign policies and interactions inside the opposing coalitions, the Allies of World War II and the Axis powers, between 1939 and 1945.

High-level diplomacy began as soon as the war started in 1939. The British Prime Minister, Winston Churchill, forged close ties with France and sought close ties with the United States, especially through his relationship with President Franklin D. Roosevelt. Following the Soviet Union's entry into the war in June 1941, Churchill called the association of the United Kingdom, the United States, the Soviet Union, and other Allies the "Grand Alliance". The United States also saw China and its leader Chiang Kai-shek as its main ally in Asia and considered it one of the "Big Four" allied powers. American diplomacy stepped up after it entered the war in December 1941 and was bolstered by large quantities of financial and economic assistance, especially after the Lend-Lease programme began to attain full strength during 1943. The Soviet Union's main diplomatic goal at first was to win support to defend against the massive German invasion. With victory in sight by 1944, Moscow began creating satellite states, first of all in Poland and East Germany. The main British goals were to defeat the German threat, maintain British roles in Central and Eastern Europe, and preserve the British Empire. The British dominions and India contributed significantly to warfighting but did not have a voice in major Allied decisions. Roosevelt was hostile to the idea of the British, French, and other empires, but was forced by Churchill to postpone interference in India. Roosevelt's main goal by 1943 was the creation of a postwar United Nations, controlled by the Allied Big Four — the Soviet Union, China, the United Kingdom, and the United States — with major roles also for France. Roosevelt was increasingly troubled by Moscow's aggressive intentions late in the war but decided that with the United Nations in place, and his own persuasive personal relationship with Stalin, problems could be resolved after the war.

For the Axis powers diplomacy was a minor factor. The alliance of Germany, Italy, and Japan was always informal, with minimal assistance or coordination. Hitler had full control of German diplomatic policies and imposed his will on his allies in Eastern Europe, and with the puppet regime in northern Italy after 1943. Japan's diplomats had a minor role in the war, as the military was in full control. A dramatic failure was the inability of Tokyo to obtain the formulas for synthetic oil from Germany until it was too late to overcome the fatal shortage of fuel for the Japanese war machine. Practically all the neutral countries broke with Germany before the end of the war and thereby were enabled to join the new United Nations.

The military history of the war is covered at World War II. The prewar diplomacy is covered in Causes of World War II and International relations (1919–1939). After the war, diplomacy revolved around the Cold War.

== Allies ==
The Allies of World War II began to form in September 1939 when Poland was invaded and Britain and France declared war on Nazi Germany. Except for Ireland, which remained neutral throughout the war, the Commonwealth Dominions (Canada, Australia, New Zealand, and South Africa) all declared war alongside Great Britain but no other nations joined their cause. The Anglo-French Supreme War Council (SWC), established at the outset, coordinated a joint military strategy. It operated until the Battle of France concluded with a successful German invasion in June 1940, after which France surrendered and Britain and its Empire continued the war against Germany.

The First Inter-Allied Conference took place in London in early June 1941 between the United Kingdom, the four co-belligerent British Dominions (Canada, Australia, New Zealand and South Africa), the eight governments in exile (Belgium, Czechoslovakia, Greece, Luxembourg, the Netherlands, Norway, Poland, Yugoslavia) and Free France.

The United States developed a secret plan, should it enter the war, to coordinate military objectives and action with the British at a military staff conference in early 1941. Through the Lend-Lease Act in March 1941, the US moved away from a position of neutrality and non-interventionism, adopting a policy to provide war materiel to the Allies. The Soviet Union, having first cooperated with Germany in invading Poland whilst remaining neutral in the Allied-Axis conflict, entered an alliance with Britain in July 1941 after being invaded by Germany. At the Atlantic Conference in August, the U.S. and Britain proposed a Soviet aid conference and set out principles for the post-war world in the Atlantic Charter, to which the other Allies, now including the Soviet Union, agreed to adhere in September. After the Japanese attack on Pearl Harbor, the U.S. joined the war in December 1941. China had already been in a prolonged war with Japan since the Marco Polo Bridge incident of 1937, and joined the Allies during December 1941.

=== The Grand Alliance ===
The United States, the United Kingdom, and the Soviet Union formed the "Big Three" Allied powers. The Big Three and China were recognized as the "Big Four", acknowledging their central role in prosecuting the war. They were in frequent contact through ambassadors, top generals, foreign ministers and special emissaries such as the American Harry Hopkins. Relations between the four resulted in the major decisions that shaped the war effort and planned for the postwar world. Cooperation between the United Kingdom and the United States was especially close and included forming a Combined Chiefs of Staff. There were numerous high-level conferences; Churchill attended 14 meetings, Roosevelt 12, and Stalin 5. Most visible were the three summit conferences that brought together the three top leaders. The Allied policy toward Germany and Japan evolved and developed at these three conferences.

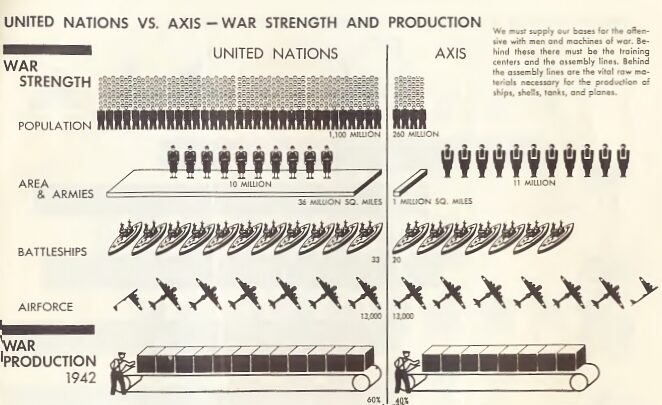
UN vs Axis War Production, near equality of strength in 1942

==== Europe first ====
At the December 1941 Arcadia Conference US President Franklin Roosevelt and British Prime Minister Winston Churchill met in Washington, shortly after the United States entered the war. They agreed on the key elements of the grand strategy. The United States and the United Kingdom would use the preponderance of their resources to subdue Nazi Germany in Europe first. Simultaneously, they would fight a holding action and limited offensive against Japan in the Pacific, using fewer resources. After the defeat of Germany—considered the greatest threat to the UK and the Soviet Union—all Allied forces could be concentrated against Japan.

The Europe first policy remained in effect throughout the war, however, the terms "holding action" and "limited offensive" in the Pacific War were subject to interpretation and modification at Allied leaders' conferences and by US senior military commanders. At Arcadia, the US agreed to send bombers to bases in England and the British agreed to strengthen their forces in the Pacific. The British rejected American proposals for a "suicidal" invasion of northern Europe in 1942. Churchill pressed instead for a landing in French North Africa during 1942. With Roosevelt's support, in July 1942 Operation Torch was scheduled for later that year. Nonetheless, it was the strategic situation in the Pacific and related logistical requirements that dominated the United States' actions after it entered into the war and led to an initial focus on the Pacific. By 1944 and 1945, the balance of US resources shifted heavily towards the European Theatre as Europe's first strategy became a reality rather than just a stated objective. Even in these later stages of the war, there was intense competition for resources as operations in both regions were scaled up.

==== Tehran Conference ====
Following preparation at the Moscow Conference in October–November 1943, the first meeting of the Big Three, Stalin, Roosevelt, and Churchill, came at the Tehran Conference in Iran from 28 November to 1 December 1943. It agreed on an invasion of France in 1944 (the "Second Front") and dealt with Turkey, Iran, the provisional Yugoslavia, and the war against Japan as well as the postwar settlement.

==== Yalta Conference ====
The Yalta Conference met in the Crimea 4–11 February 1945. It focused on postwar plans for European boundaries. The Soviets already controlled Poland. The new boundaries shifted Poland westward. Stalin was promised control of western Belorussia and western Ukraine. Poland was to gain parts of Germany. Stalin promised free elections in Poland under the auspices of a government he controlled. At Roosevelt's strong urging, Stalin agreed to enter the war against Japan three months after the defeat of Germany. It was agreed the USSR would be a member of the United Nations Security Council, with a veto, and Ukraine and Belorussia would be UN members, but not the other 12 Soviet republics. Germany was to be divided into three zones of occupation, and France was also to get a zone. In a decision that became highly controversial, all civilians would be repatriated.

Clement Attlee, Harry Truman and Joseph Stalin at the Potsdam Conference, c. 28 July – 1 August 1945

==== Potsdam Conference ====
The Potsdam Conference was held from 17 July to 2 August 1945, at Potsdam, Germany, near Berlin. Stalin met with the new US President Harry S. Truman and two British prime ministers in succession—Winston Churchill and Clement Attlee. It demanded "unconditional surrender" from Japan, and finalized arrangements for Germany to be occupied and controlled by the Allied Control Commission. The status of other occupied countries was discussed in line with the basic agreements made earlier at Yalta.

=== The United Nations ===
The Declaration by United Nations formalized the Allies in January 1942. The Big Four (the United States, United Kingdom, Soviet Union, and China) were joined by numerous other Allied countries who had signed the Declaration and declared war on the Axis powers. Under Roosevelt's leadership, this "United Nations" alliance in 1945 became a new organization to replace the defunct League of Nations.

==== Four Policemen ====
The Four Policemen was a council with the Big Four that U.S. president Franklin D. Roosevelt proposed as a guarantor of world peace. Their members were called the Four Powers during World War II and were the four major Allies of World War II: the United Kingdom, the United States, the Soviet Union, and the Republic of China. Roosevelt repeatedly used the term "Four Policemen" starting in 1942. As a compromise with internationalist critics, the Big Four nations became the permanent members of the UN Security Council, with significantly less power than had been envisioned in the Four Policemen proposal. When the United Nations was officially established later in 1945, France was in due course added as the fifth permanent member of the Security Council because of the insistence of Churchill.

==== Moscow Conference of 1943 ====
The October 1943 Moscow Conference resulted in the Moscow Declarations, including the Four Power Declaration on General Security. This declaration was signed by the Allied Big Four—the United States, the Soviet Union, the United Kingdom, and China—and aimed for the creation "at the earliest possible date of a general international organization". This was the first public announcement that a new international organization was being contemplated to replace the League of Nations.

==== Dumbarton Oaks Conference ====
At the Dumbarton Oaks Conference or, more formally, the Washington Conversations on International Peace and Security Organization, delegations from the United States and the United Kingdom met first with the delegation from the Soviet Union and then with the delegation from the Republic of China. They deliberated over proposals for the establishment of an organization to maintain peace and security in the world to replace the ineffective League of Nations. The conference was held at Dumbarton Oaks from 21 August 1944 to 7 October 1944. Delegates from other nations participated in the consideration and formulation of these principles.

==== San Francisco Conference ====
The San Francisco Conference was a convention of delegates from 50 Allied nations that took place from 25 April 1945 to 26 June 1945 in San Francisco, United States. The four sponsoring countries (the United States, Britain, the Soviet Union, and China) invited the other nations and the heads of their four delegations took turns as chairmen of the plenary meetings. At this convention, the delegates reviewed and rewrote the Dumbarton Oaks agreements. The convention resulted in the creation of the United Nations Charter, which was opened for signature on 26 June.

=== Anglo-American Relations ===
Though most Americans favored Britain in the war, there was widespread opposition to American military intervention in European affairs. President Roosevelt's policy of cash-and-carry still allowed Britain and France to purchase munitions from the United States and carry them home.

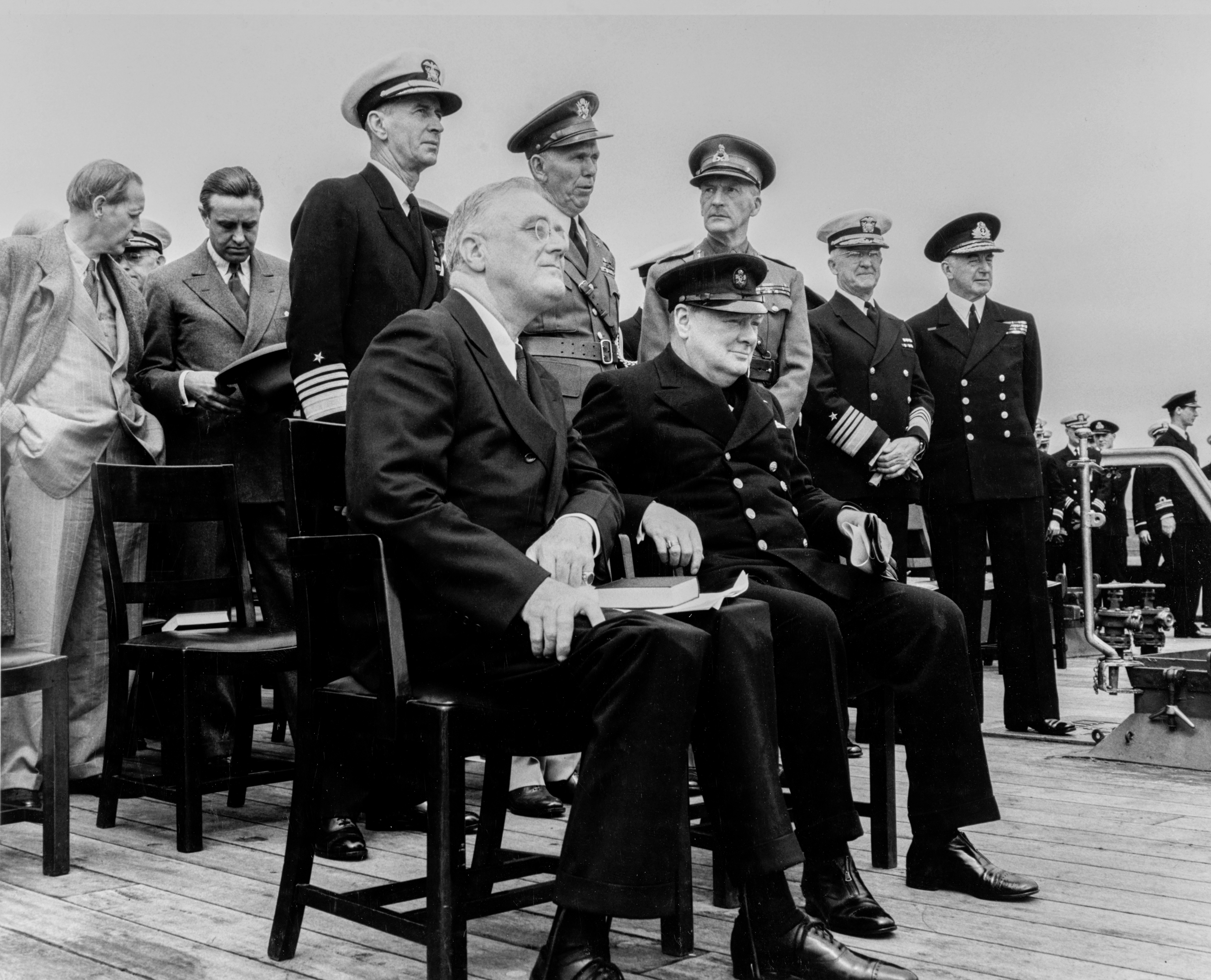
Roosevelt and Churchill drafted the Atlantic Charter in August 1941.

Churchill, who had long warned against Germany, and demanded rearmament, became prime minister after Chamberlain's policy of appeasement had collapsed and Britain was unable to reverse the German invasion of Norway in April 1940. After the fall of France, Roosevelt gave Britain all aid short of war. The Destroyers for Bases Agreement of September 1940, gave the United States a ninety-nine-year lease on strategically located bases in the Atlantic in exchange for the Royal Navy receiving fifty old destroyers to use against German U-boats in the Battle of the Atlantic. Roosevelt also sold (for cash) munitions that were carried away in British ships, including over half a million rifles, 85,000 machine guns, 25,000 automatic rifles, mortars, and hundreds of field guns, with supplies of the necessary ammunition. The British needed these munitions to reequip the soldiers who lost all their arms when Dunkirk was evacuated in June 1940.

Beginning in March 1941, the United States enacted Lend-Lease sending tanks, warplanes, munitions, ammunition, food, and medical supplies. Britain received $31.4 billion out of a total of $50.1 billion of supplies sent to the Allies. In sharp contrast to the First World War, these were not loans, and no repayment was involved.

Millions of American servicemen were based in Britain during the war, which led to a certain amount of friction with British men and intermarriage with British women. This animosity was explored in art and film, most particularly A Matter of Life and Death and A Canterbury Tale. In 1945 Churchill sent the British Pacific Fleet to help the United States attack and invade Japan.

==== Casablanca Conference ====
From January 14–24, 1943 Roosevelt, Churchill, and the Combined Staff met in Casablanca, Morocco. They decided on the major Allied strategy for 1943 in Europe. The main decisions made were to invade Sicily and Italy before Europe, launch strategic bombing against Germany, and approve a U.S. Navy plan to advance on Japan through the Pacific Islands. The invasion of Sicily was an important decision that Churchill pushed for, hoping to defer the Americans' determination to open a second front in France in 1943 to avoid severe Allied casualties. They agreed on a policy of "unconditional surrender". This policy uplifted Allied morale, but it also stiffened the Nazis' resolve to fight to the bitter end.

=== British Empire ===
Having signed the Anglo-Polish military alliance in August 1939, Britain declared war against Germany following its invasion of Poland in September 1939. This declaration included the Crown colonies and India, which Britain directly controlled. The dominions were independent in foreign policy, though all entered a state of war with Germany either immediately after the British declaration of war or in the days after the declaration was made. Although Britain and France declared war, there was little they could or did do to help Poland. The Anglo-French Supreme War Council (SWC) was established to oversee joint military strategy.

After the French defeat in June 1940, Britain and its empire stood alone in combat against Germany, until June 1941. The United States gave strong diplomatic, financial, and material support, starting in 1940, especially through Lend-Lease, which began in 1941. In August 1941, Churchill and Roosevelt met and agreed on the Atlantic Charter, which proclaimed "the rights of all peoples to choose the form of government under which they live" should be respected. This wording was ambiguous and would be interpreted differently by the British, Americans, and nationalist movements.

Starting in December 1941, Japan overran British possessions in Asia, including Hong Kong, Malaya, and especially the key base at Singapore, and marched into Burma, headed toward India. Churchill's reaction to the entry of the United States into the war was that Britain was now assured of victory and the future of the empire was safe, but the rapid defeats irreversibly harmed Britain's standing and prestige as an imperial power. The realisation that Britain could not defend them pushed Australia and New Zealand into permanent close ties with the United States.

==== Plans for intervention in the Winter War against USSR ====
The USSR launched the Winter War against Finland in November 1939. The Finns made a remarkable defense against the much larger Soviet forces. The unprovoked invasion excited widespread outrage at popular and elite levels in support of Finland not only in wartime Britain and France but also in the neutral United States. The League of Nations declared the USSR was the aggressor and expelled it. "American opinion makers treated the attack on Finland as dastardly aggression worthy of daily headlines, which thereafter exacerbated attitudes toward Russia." Elite opinion in Britain and France swung in favor of military intervention. Winston Churchill, as head of the Royal Navy, and French Premier Paul Reynaud were the chief advocates. It came when there was a military stalemate on the continent called the "Phoney War". Months of planning at the highest civilian, military, and diplomatic levels in London and Paris, saw multiple reversals and deep divisions. Finally the British and French agreed on a plan that involved uninvited invasions of neutral Norway, Sweden, Iceland, and Denmark's Faroe Islands, with the goals chiefly of damaging the German war economy and also assisting Finland in its war with the Soviet Union. An allied war against the Soviet Union was part of the plan.

The actual Allied goal was not to help Finland but to engage in economic warfare against Germany by cutting off shipments of Swedish iron ore, which they calculated would seriously weaken the German war industry. The British Ministry of Economic Warfare stated that the project against Norway would be likely to cause "an extremely serious repercussion on German industrial output ... and would in any case have a profound effect on the duration of the war." The idea was to shift forces away from doing little on the static Western Front into an active role on a new front. The British military leadership by December became enthusiastic supporters when they realized that their first choice, an attack on German oil supplies, would not get approval but this plan would win strong support. The poor performance of the Soviet army against the Finns strengthened the confidence of the Allies that the invasion, and the resulting war with the Soviet Union, would be worthwhile. However, the civilian leadership of Neville Chamberlain's government in London drew back and postponed invasion plans. The neutrals refused to cooperate. Meanwhile, Finland was overwhelmed and gave in to Moscow on 13 March 1940 and the plan was postponed. War plans against the USSR were dropped and the new goal was to mine the Norwegian coast to prevent the passage of ships carrying iron ore from northern Norway. There were more delays and when mining operations finally started on 9 April it was too late—the Germans hours before had invaded Norway and had the upper hand in the Norwegian campaign.

==== German invasion 1940 ====
When Germany began its attack on France in May 1940, British troops and French troops again fought side by side, but defeat came quickly. The Royal Navy evacuated 198,000 British and 140,000 French soldiers in the Dunkirk evacuation in late May/early June 1940. Tens of thousands of tanks, trucks, and artillery guns were left behind, as well as countless radios, machine guns, rifles, tents, spare parts, and other gear. The new British Prime Minister, Winston Churchill, pledged that the United Kingdom would continue to fight for France's freedom—even if it must do so without France. After Mers el Kebir, Britain recognized Free France as both its ally and the only legitimate French government.

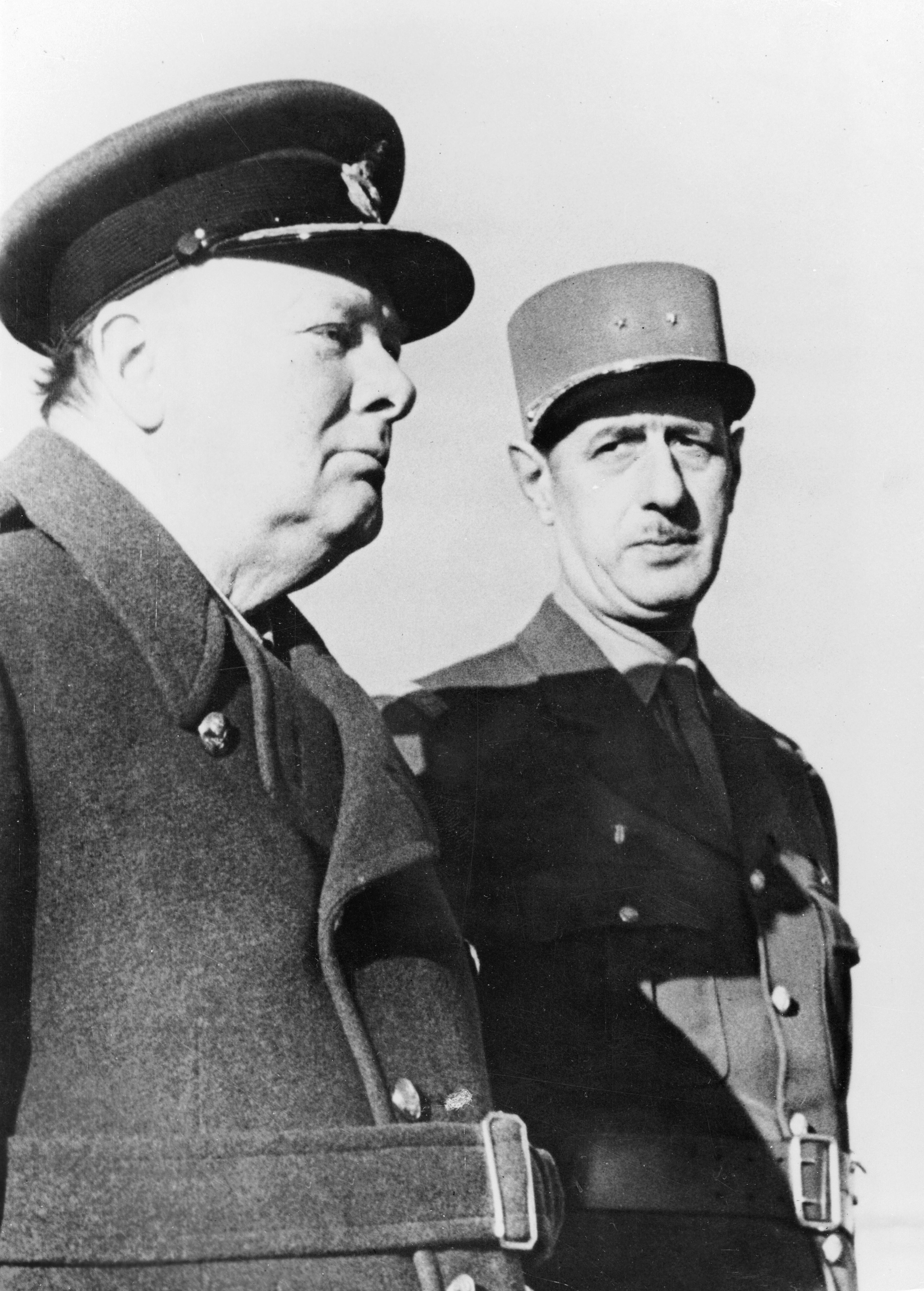
Prime Minister Churchill and General de Gaulle at Marrakesh, January 1944

In contrast, the United States formally recognized and established diplomatic relations with Vichy France (until late 1942) and avoided formal relations with the exiled government of de Gaulle and its claim to be the only legitimate government of France. Churchill, caught between the US and de Gaulle, tried to find a compromise.

==== Britain and the Soviet Union ====
The Anglo-Soviet Agreement was signed in July 1941 allying with the two countries. This was broadened to a political alliance with the Anglo-Soviet Treaty of 1942.

In October 1944 Churchill and his Foreign Minister Anthony Eden met in Moscow with Stalin and his foreign minister Vyacheslav Molotov. They planned who would control what in postwar Eastern Europe. They agreed to give 90% of the influence in Greece to Britain and 90% in Romania to the USSR. USSR gained an 80%/20% division in Bulgaria and Hungary. There was a 50/50 division in Yugoslavia and no Soviet share in Italy.

==== Middle East ====
===== Iraq =====
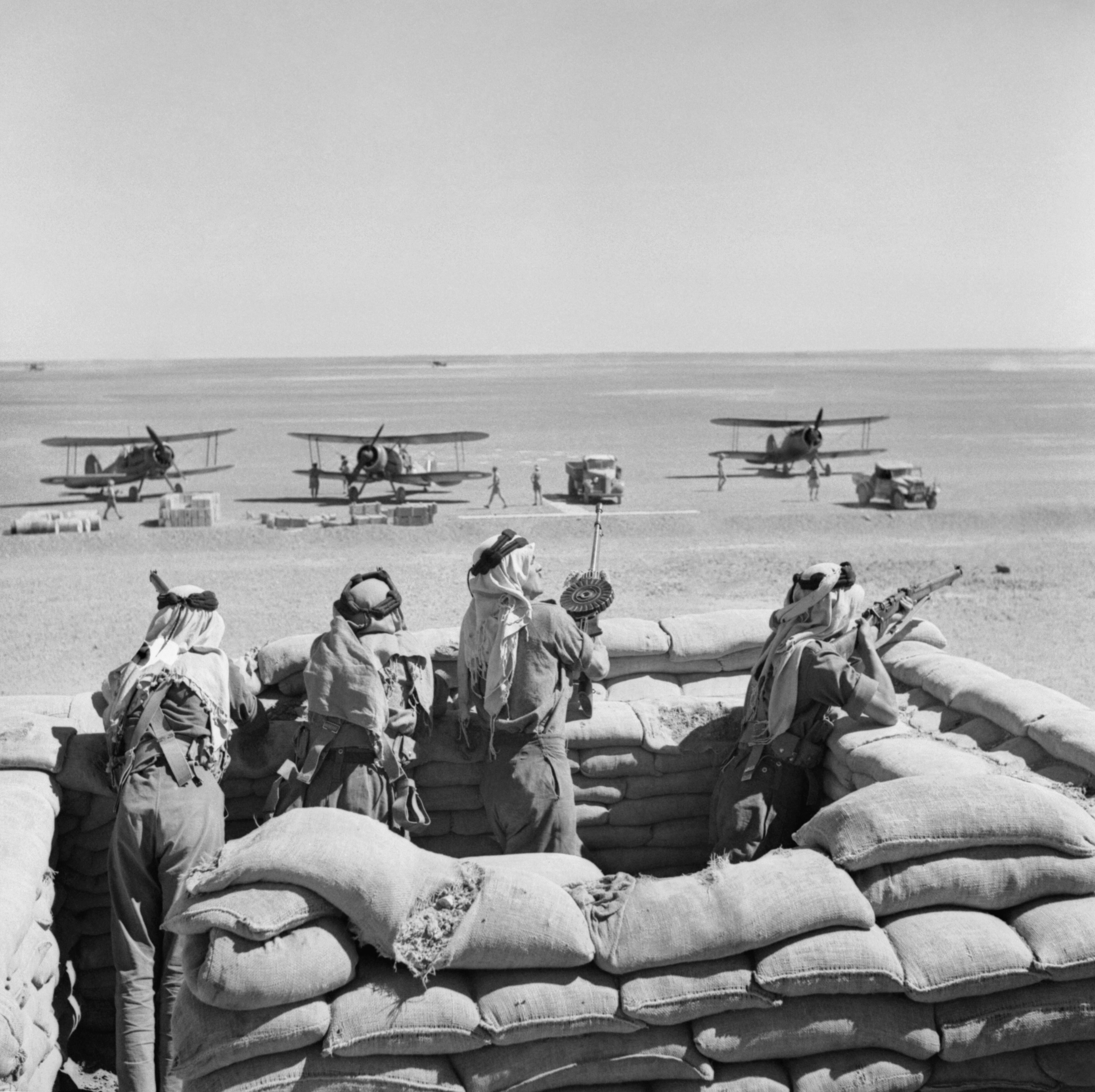
Gloster Gladiators of British RAF refuel in Iraq, 1941

Iraq was an independent country in 1939, with a strong British presence, especially in the oil fields. Iraq broke relations with Germany but there was a strong pro-Italian element. The regime of Regent Abd al-Ilah was overthrown in 1941 by the Golden Square pro-Italian army officers, headed by Rashid Ali al-Gaylani. The short-living pro-Nazi government was overpowered in May 1941 by British forces in a quick campaign and the Regent returned to power. Iraq was later used as a base for allied attacks on Vichy-French held Mandate of Syria and support for the Anglo-Soviet invasion of Iran.

===== Iran (Persia) =====
In 1939 the ruler of Iran was Reza Shah. He was a modernizer who had little use for traditional religion but collaborated with the Germans. Iran proclaimed neutrality when the war began in 1939. British and Soviet forces occupied Iran in August 1941, deposed the Shah, and installed his son Mohammad Reza Shah Pahlavi. Iran, with a largely rural population of 13 million, had oil wells and became a major route for shipping military supplies from the US to the Soviet Union.

At the Tehran Conference of 1943, Stalin, Roosevelt, and Churchill issued the Tehran Declaration that guaranteed the postwar independence and boundaries of Iran. However, when the war ended, Soviet troops stationed in northwestern Iran not only refused to withdraw but backed revolts that established short-lived, pro-Soviet separatist national states in the northern regions of Azerbaijan and Iranian Kurdistan, the Azerbaijan People's Government and the Republic of Kurdistan respectively, in late 1945. Soviet troops did not withdraw from Iran proper until May 1946 after receiving a promise of oil concessions. The Soviet republics in the north were soon overthrown and the oil concessions were revoked.

==== India ====
Serious tension erupted over American demands that India be given independence, a proposition Churchill vehemently rejected. For years Roosevelt had encouraged Britain's disengagement from India. The American position was based on principled opposition to colonialism, practical concern for the outcome of the war, and the expectation of a large American role in a post-colonial era. However, in 1942 when the Congress Party launched a Quit India Movement, the British authorities immediately arrested tens of thousands of activists, including Jawaharlal Nehru and Mahatma Gandhi, and imprisoned them until 1945. Meanwhile, India became the main American staging base for aid to China. Churchill threatened to resign if Roosevelt pushed too hard regarding independence, so Roosevelt backed down.

==== British Commonwealth ====
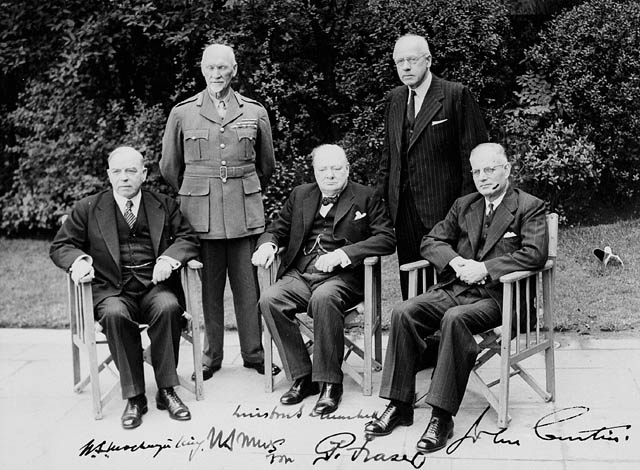
The prime ministers of five members of the Commonwealth of Nations at the 1944 Commonwealth Prime Ministers' Conference.

As the Statute of Westminster 1931 was not yet ratified by the parliaments of Australia and New Zealand when the King declared war against Germany on 3 September 1939, the declaration also applied to them. As the Statute of Westminster was already in effect in Canada and South Africa, they issued their declarations of war against Germany in September 1939. South Africa issued a formal declaration of war against Germany on 6 September, following debates in the South African parliament between the pro-British faction, led by Jan Smuts, and supporters of neutrality, led by Albert Hertzog. The Canadian declaration of war on Germany was issued on 10 September. However, as opposed to South Africa, there was little debate over the issue. Shortly after the British declaration of war on 3 September, the Canadian Prime Minister William Lyon Mackenzie King made a radio address to the Canadian public, stating that he stands with Britain, and would recommend for a declaration of war to the Canadian Parliament. The parliamentary vote on the declaration was delayed by Mackenzie King, partly as a symbolic statement of the dominion having an autonomous foreign policy, but also to give Canada time to purchase arms from the U.S. These sales were otherwise barred to belligerents until Congress relaxed the Neutrality Act in November.

Britain generally handled the diplomatic relations of the Commonwealth nations. Canada hosted top-level meetings between Britain and the US (the First and Second Quebec Conference), although Canadian representatives only participated in limited bilateral discussions during those summits. As opposed to World War I, the British government, and the governments in the dominions did not form an Imperial War Cabinet, although the establishment of one was proposed by the Australian government in 1941. The proposal was rejected by both Churchill, and Mackenzie King; the former was unwilling to share powers with the dominions, and the latter wanted to maintain the appearance that the dominions have an autonomous foreign policy. Mackenzie King also viewed the formal establishment of an Imperial War Cabinet as unnecessary, believing that contemporary methods of communication and the appointment of high commissioners to the other realms, had already provided the governments with an "invisible imperial cabinet".

===== Australia =====
During the war, Australia felt abandoned by London and moved to a close relationship with the US, playing a support role in the American war against Japan. Australian Prime Minister John Curtin stated, "I make it clear that Australia looks to America, free of any pangs as to our traditional links or kinship with the United Kingdom." US President Roosevelt ordered General Douglas MacArthur to move the American base from the Philippines to Brisbane, Australia. By September 1943, more than 120,000 American soldiers were in Australia. The Americans were warmly welcomed but there were some tensions, including the so-called Battle of Brisbane. MacArthur worked very closely with the Australian government and took command of its combat operations.

Fighting continued throughout Southeast Asia for the next two years. MacArthur promoted a policy of "island hopping" for his American troops while he suggested that the Australian troops should continue clearing and rounding up the Japanese from New Guinea, New Britain, Borneo, and Bougainville.

The Canberra Pact of 1944 between Australia and New Zealand was criticized in the United States.

===== Canada =====
Canada's declaration of war drew criticism from some American isolationists, with noted American isolationist Charles Lindbergh attacking Canada for drawing the Western Hemisphere "into a European war simply because they prefer the Crown of England", to the independence of the Americas. However, most American isolationists who were critical of Roosevelt's for assisting the British, were unable to levy the same criticism for assisting Canada. After the fall of France, concerns that the British may be defeated grew in North America, prompting military meetings between Canada and the United States in July 1940. On 16 August 1940, the two countries entered into the Ogdensburg Agreement, which outlined plans for the mutual defense of North America, as well as the establishment of the Permanent Joint Board on Defense. Initially, the plans for mutual defense included the Americans assuming command of Canadian forces in the event of an invasion; however, as the situation improved for the British in 1941, revised defense plans saw the Canadian government refuse to defer command of its forces to the Americans.

The need to develop necessary facilities in northern Canada saw 33,000 American soldiers and civilians working in that region during the war, to build the Alaska Highway, the Canol pipeline, and military airstrips for aircraft flying to/from the Soviet Union. The large American presence in northern Canada raised concerns for the British High Commissioner to Canada, who notified Mackenzie King of the potential implications the American presence could have on its sovereignty. A special commissioner was appointed by the Canadian government in May 1943, to monitor American activities in northern Canada, and report it back to Ottawa. In December 1943, the Canadian government stated it would purchase all military installations constructed by the Americans in Canada during the war, to prevent the Americans from retaining the properties.

As opposed to the United Kingdom, and the other dominions of the British Empire, Canada maintained relations with Vichy France until November 1942. Relations were maintained with Vichy France as the British wanted to maintain an open channel of communication with its government. The Canadian government was involved in a brief diplomatic incident between the Free French, and the United States after Charles de Gaulle captured Saint Pierre and Miquelon from the local Vichy regime. As the territory was nearby Newfoundland, the American government demanded that Canada remove the Free French from the islands, although the Canadians made no efforts to do so. However, the Canadian government did not formally recognize Free France as the legitimate French government until October 1944, during de Gaulle's visit to Montreal.

===== New Zealand =====
The Labour Government had been critical of the fascist powers. For example, New Zealand opposed the lifting of sanctions against Italy for the second Italian invasion of Abyssinia and the League of Nations’ lack of challenge to Italian aggression. During the war, New Zealand assumed responsibility for the defense of some British colonies in the Pacific on behalf of Britain.

In 1944, New Zealand signed the Canberra Pact with Australia, to increase cooperation on international affairs between the two nations. The move was criticized by the United States over the lack of its consultation.

===== South Africa =====
At the outset of the war in September 1939, the fears in London that South Africa would take the advice of Prime Minister J. B. M. Hertzog and remain neutral were relieved when the South African Parliament voted 80 to 67 for war, and Hertzog resigned.

=== United States ===
President Roosevelt tried to avoid repeating what he saw as Woodrow Wilson's mistakes in World War I. Wilson called for neutrality in thought and deed, while Roosevelt made it clear his administration strongly favored Britain and China. Unlike the loans in World War I, the United States made large-scale grants of military and economic aid to the Allies through Lend-Lease, with little expectation of repayment. Wilson did not greatly expand war production before the declaration of war; Roosevelt did. After Japan attacked Pearl Harbor, Guam, Wake Island, and the Philippines on December 7, 1941, Congress declared war on Japan the following day, December 8, 1941. Roosevelt often mentioned his role in the Wilson administration, but added that he had profited more from Wilson's errors than from his successes.

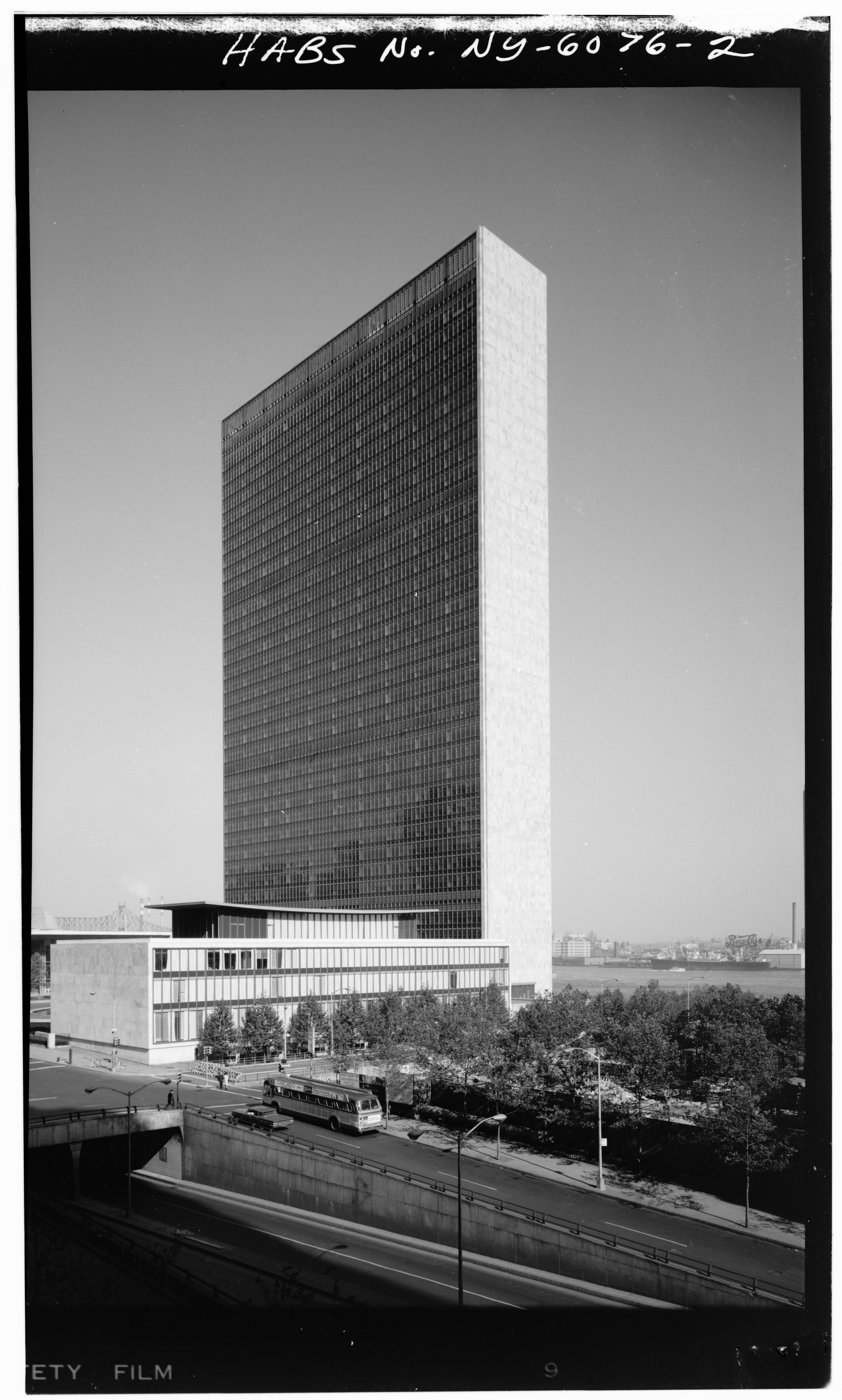
The major long-term goal of Roosevelt's foreign policy during the war was creating a United Nations to resolve all world problems.

==== 1941 and 1942 ====
After Pearl Harbor, antiwar sentiment in the United States evaporated overnight; The nation was now united on foreign policy. On December 11, 1941, Germany and Italy declared war on the United States, which responded in kind. Roosevelt and his military advisers implemented a war strategy with the objectives of halting the German advances in the Soviet Union and in North Africa; launching an invasion of Western Europe with the aim of crushing Nazi Germany between two fronts; and saving China and defeating Japan. Public opinion, however, gave priority to the destruction of Japan, so American forces were sent chiefly to the Pacific in 1942.

In the opening weeks of the war, Japan had conquered the Philippines, and the British and Dutch colonies in Southeast Asia, capturing Singapore in February 1942. Furthermore, Japan cut off the overland supply route to China. The United States flew supplies to China "over the hump" (the Himalayan Mountains) at enormous cost until a road could be opened in 1945.

Roosevelt met with Churchill in late December and planned a broad informal alliance among the US, Britain, China, and the Soviet Union. This included Churchill's initial plan to invade North Africa (called Operation Gymnast) and the primary plan of the US generals for a Western Europe invasion, focused directly on Germany (Operation Sledgehammer). An agreement was also reached for a centralized command and offensive in the Pacific Theatre called ABDA (American, British, Dutch, Australian) to save China and defeat Japan. Nevertheless, the Atlantic First strategy was intact, to Churchill's great satisfaction. On New Year's Day 1942, Churchill and Roosevelt issued the "Declaration by United Nations", representing 26 countries in opposition to the Tripartite Pact of Germany, Italy, and Japan.

=== China ===
In 1931, Japan took advantage of China's very weak central government in the Warlord Era and fabricated the Mukden incident to set up the puppet state of Manchukuo in Manchuria. Puyi, who had been the last emperor of China, became "emperor" of China again; he was a Japanese puppet. In 1937, the Marco Polo Bridge incident triggered the Second Sino-Japanese War. The invasion was launched by the bombing of many cities such as Shanghai, Nanjing and Guangzhou. The latest, which began on 22 and 23 September 1937, called forth widespread protests culminating in a resolution by the Far Eastern Advisory Committee of the League of Nations. The Imperial Japanese Army captured the Chinese capital city of Nanjing, and committed war crimes in the Nanjing Massacre. The war tied down large numbers of Chinese soldiers, so Japan set up three different Chinese puppet states to enlist some Chinese support.

The United States was a strong supporter of China after Japan invaded in 1937. Even the isolationists who opposed war in Europe supported a hard line against Japan. The outbreak of the Second Sino-Japanese War in 1937 saw aid flow into the Republic of China, led by Chiang Kai-shek.

American public sympathy for the Chinese was aroused by reports from missionaries, novelists such as Pearl Buck, and Time magazine of Japanese brutality in China, including reports surrounding the Nanjing Massacre, also known as the "Rape of Nanjing". Japanese-American relations were further soured by the USS Panay incident during the bombing of Nanjing. Roosevelt demanded an apology from the Japanese, which was received, but relations between the two countries continued to deteriorate. By early 1941 the US was preparing to send American planes flown by American pilots under American command, but wearing Chinese uniforms, to fight the Japanese invaders and even to bomb Japanese cities. The "Flying Tigers" under Claire Chennault arrived just as the US entered the war. Chennault had developed an ambitious plan for a sneak attack on Japanese bases. The US military was opposed to his scheme, and kept raising obstacles, but it was adopted by top civilian officials including Henry Morgenthau Jr. (the Secretary of the Treasury who financed China) and especially President Roosevelt himself, who made it a high priority to keep China alive. By October 1941, bombers and crews were on their way to China. However the American attack never took place. The bombers and crews arrived after Pearl Harbor and were used for the war in Burma, for they lacked the range to reach China.

To augment Chennault's 100 P-40Bs, in May 1941 Washington decided to send 144 Vultee P-48s, 125 P-43s and 66 Lockheed and Douglas medium bombers. The goal was to give China by early 1942, a respectable air force, judged by Far Eastern standards, sufficient to "(a) protect strategic points, (b) permit local army offensive action, (c) permit the bombing of Japanese air bases and supply dumps in China and Indo-China, and the bombing of coastal and river transport, and (d) permit occasional incendiary bombing of Japan."

==== Wartime ====
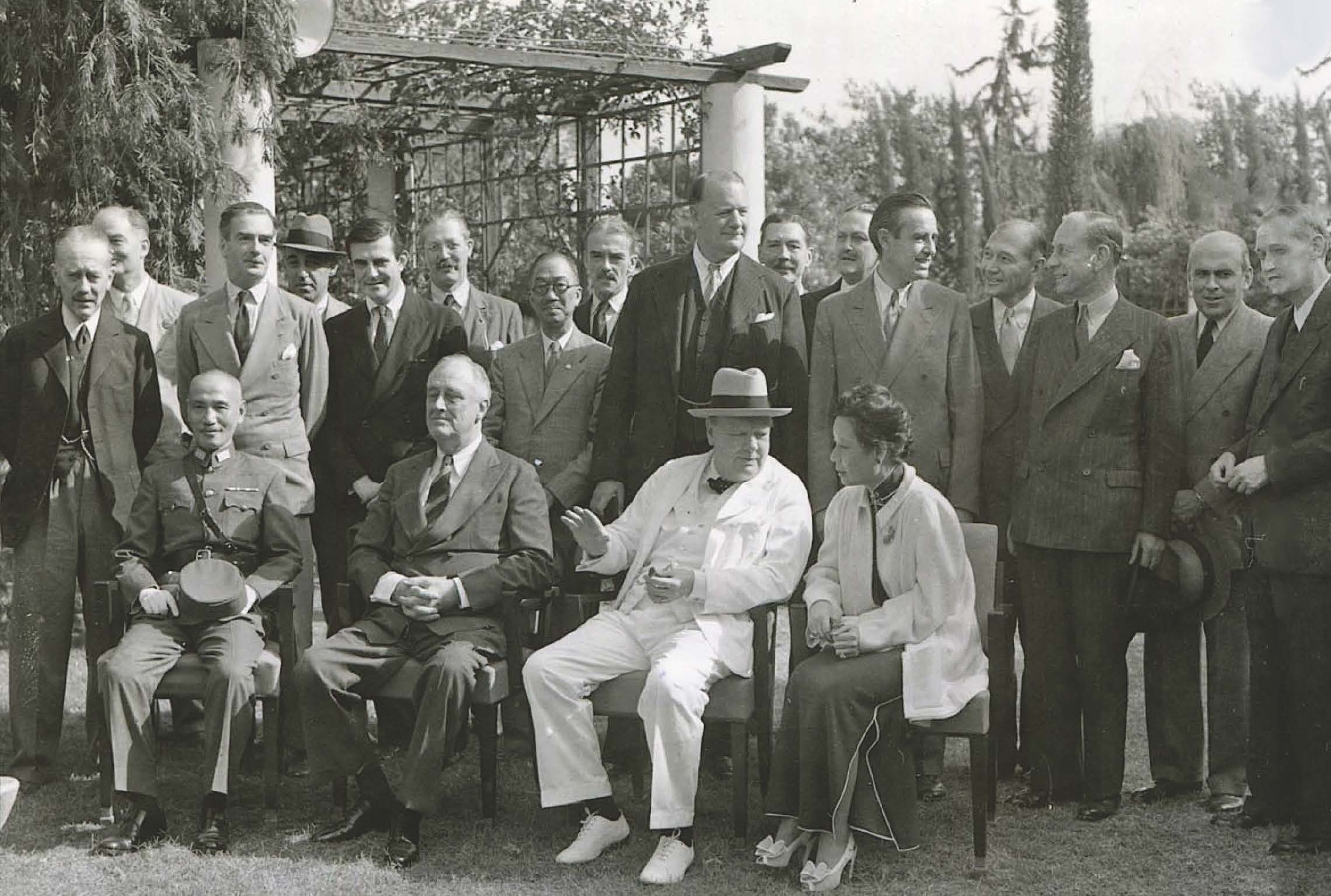
Chiang Kai-shek, Franklin D. Roosevelt, and Winston Churchill meeting at the Cairo Conference in 1943

After the formal declaration of war in December 1941, the US stepped up the flow of aid, but it had to be routed through India and over the Himalayan Mountains because Japan blocked the other routes. Chiang's beleaguered government was now headquartered in remote Chongqing. Madame Chiang Kai-shek, who had been educated in the United States, addressed the US Congress and toured the country to rally support for China. Congress amended the Chinese Exclusion Act and Roosevelt moved to end the unequal treaties. However, the perception that Chiang's government, with his poorly equipped and ill-fed troops was unable to effectively fight the Japanese or that he preferred to focus more on defeating the Communists grew. China Hands such as Joseph Stilwell argued that it was in American interest to establish communication with the Communists to prepare for a land-based counteroffensive invasion of Japan. The Dixie Mission, which began in 1943, was the first official American contact with the Communists. Other Americans, such as Claire Chennault, argued for air power. In 1944, Generalissimo Chiang acceded to Roosevelt's request that an American general take charge of all forces in the area, but demanded that Stilwell be recalled. General Albert Wedemeyer replaced Stilwell, Patrick Hurley became ambassador, and US–Chinese relations became much smoother.

==== Cairo Conference ====
Chiang Kai-shek of China with Roosevelt and Churchill at the Cairo Conference in 1943.

The Cairo Conference held in Cairo, Egypt, November 23–26, 1943, outlined the Allied position against Japan during World War II and made decisions about postwar Asia. The meeting was attended by President Roosevelt, Prime Minister Churchill, and Generalissimo Chiang Kai-shek of the Republic of China. Soviet General Secretary Joseph Stalin did not attend the conference because his meeting with Chiang could have caused friction between the Soviet Union and Japan.

==== Post war ====
After World War II ended in 1945, the showdown came between the Nationalists and the Communists in a full-scale civil war. American general George C. Marshall tried to broker a truce but he failed. The Kuomintang (Nationalist) military position steadily worsened and by 1949, the Communists were victorious and drove the Nationalists from the mainland onto the island of Taiwan and other islands. Mao Zedong established the People's Republic of China (PRC) in mainland China, while the Republic of China remains in Taiwan to this day.

=== Soviet Union ===
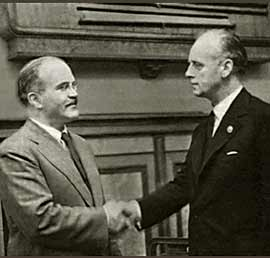
Soviet foreign minister Vyacheslav Molotov (left) meets with German foreign minister Joachim von Ribbentrop at the signing of the German–Soviet non-aggression pact on 23 August 1939

Joseph Stalin controlled the foreign policy of the Soviet Union, with Vyacheslav Molotov as his foreign minister. Their policy was hostility to Nazi Germany until August 1939. The Soviet military had conversations in Moscow with a high level military delegation from Britain and France that led nowhere. The Soviets demanded an agreement from Poland to allow Soviet troops to enter that country to defend it against Germany, but Poland refused. On August 21, Hitler made friendly proposals to Stalin that led to the Molotov–Ribbentrop nonaggression pact on August 23. It stunned the world. The Soviets achieved friendly relations with Germany in order to carve up key elements of Eastern Europe, especially Poland and the Baltic states. Following the pact, Germany invaded and quickly defeated Poland; then the Soviets invaded and took control of its preassigned areas of eastern Poland. Both invaders systematically decimated the Polish elite. In the 1940 Katyn massacre, the NKVD (Soviet secret police) executed 22,000 Polish military and police officers and civilian intelligentsia.

For the next two years, the USSR supplied Germany with oil and grain. Furthermore, the Kremlin ordered communist parties around the world to denounce the imperialistic war waged by Britain and France against Germany. For example, B. Farnborough says, "During the entire period up to the fall of France the British Communist Party functioned as a propaganda agency for Hitler."

After he ignored repeated warnings, Stalin was stunned when Hitler invaded in June 1941. Stalin eventually came to terms with Britain and the United States, cemented through a series of summit meetings. The US and Britain supplied war materials through Lend-Lease. There was some coordination of military action, especially in summer 1944. At war's end it was doubtful whether Stalin would allow free elections in eastern Europe. The central diplomatic issue was future of Allies, and as it turned out this Soviet-Western alliance was not a permanent one.

=== France ===
==== French Republic ====
The Franco-Polish alliance was signed in 1921. France and Britain collaborated closely in 1939, and together declared war against Germany two days after it invaded Poland. Apart from the British Dominions (Canada, Australia, New Zealand and South Africa), no independent nation joined their cause. Britain and France took a defensive posture, fearing German air attacks on cities. France hoped the Maginot Line would protect it from an invasion. There was little fighting between the fall of Poland in mid-September and the following spring; it was the Phoney War in Britain or Drôle de guerre—the funny sort of war—in France. Britain tried several peace feelers, but Hitler did not respond.

When Germany had its hands free for an attack in the west, it launched its Blitzkrieg against Denmark and Norway, easily pushing the British out. Then it invaded the Low Countries and tricked Britain and France into sending its best combat units deep into the Netherlands, where they became trapped in the Battle of France in May 1940. The Royal Navy rescued over 300,000 British and French soldiers from Dunkirk, but left behind all the equipment.

==== Vichy France ====
===== Relationships with Germany =====
Paris fell to the Germans on 14 June 1940, and the government surrendered in the Armistice of 22 June 1940 with new leader Marshal Philippe Pétain (1856–1951). His Vichy regime was authoritarian, Catholic, paternal and anti-semitic. His charisma and popularity from his heroic role in the First World War strengthened his authority, although he was increasingly too old to pay attention to details. After Germany seized all of Vichy in October 1942, it installed Pierre Laval as its puppet leaving Pétain as a helpless figurehead.

The armistice included numerous provisions that weakened France, all largely guaranteed by the German policy of keeping 2 million French prisoners of war and workers in Germany as hostages. Vichy France was nominally a neutral country. It never declared war on the Soviet Union or Britain, and was recognized diplomatically by the United States until 1942. Although Vichy France was nominally in control of all of France—apart from Alsace-Lorraine—in practice the Germans controlled three-fifths of the country, including the northern and western coasts, the industrial northeast, and the Paris region. The Petain government relocated to the resort town of in Vichy and controlled the rest. From the start, Germany wanted food, minerals, and industrial productions, as well as volunteers to work in German factories. Vichy was allowed to control its foreign colonies—to the extent it could defend them against the Free French—as well as its fleet, to the extent it could defend it against British naval attacks. In October 1942, Germany took it all over; the Vichy regime became entirely a puppet of the German occupiers.

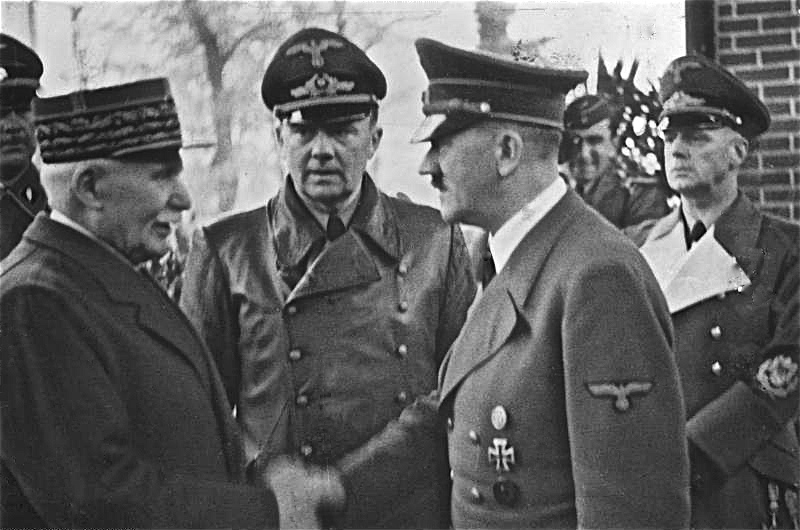
Marshal Pétain, left, head of Vichy France, shaking hands with Hitler on October 24, 1940.

The small town of Montoire-sur-le-Loir was the scene of two meetings. On October 22, 1940, Pierre Laval met with Hitler to set up a meeting on October 24 between Hitler and Pétain. It ended in a much-publicized handshake between the two, but in fact their discussions had been entirely general and no decisions had been made. Hitler was impressed with Petain's commitment to defending the French Empire. False rumours abounded that France had made major concessions regarding colonies and German control of French ports and the French fleet. Germany controlled the entire French economy, and demanded huge reparations in gold and food. However nearly 2 million French soldiers became prisoners of war in Germany. They served as hostages and forced laborers in German factories. Vichy was intensely conservative and anti-communist, but it was practically helpless. Vichy finally collapsed when the Germans fled in summer 1944. The United States granted Vichy full diplomatic recognition, sending Admiral William D. Leahy to Paris as American ambassador. President Roosevelt hoped to use American influence to encourage those elements in the Vichy government opposed to military collaboration with Germany. Vichy still controlled its overseas colonies and Washington encouraged Vichy to resist German demands such as for air bases in Syria or to move war supplies through French North Africa. The essential American position was that France should take no action not explicitly required by the armistice terms that could adversely affect Allied efforts in the war. When Germany took full control, the US and Canada cut their ties with Vichy. By 1942, Germany was demanding that Vichy turnover the Jews for deportation to German concentration camps. Reluctantly at first, then more enthusiastically, Vichy complied. They turned over 80,000 of the 330,000 French and foreign Jews living in Vichy; the Germans killed 77,000. When Germany tried to seize the French fleet at Toulon in November, 1942, the French Navy scuttled all its ships.

===== French fleet =====
Britain feared that the powerful French Navy could end up in German hands and be used against its own naval forces, which were so vital to maintaining north Atlantic shipping and communications. Under the armistice, France had been allowed to retain the French Navy, the Marine Nationale, under strict conditions. Vichy pledged that the fleet would never fall into the hands of Germany, but refused to send the fleet beyond Germany's reach by sending it to Britain or to far away territories of the French empire such as the West Indies. Shortly after France gave up it attacked a large French naval contingent in Mers-el-Kebir, killing 1,297 French military personnel. Vichy severed diplomatic relations but did not declare war on Britain. Churchill also ordered French ships in British ports to be seized by the Royal Navy. The French squadron at Alexandria, Egypt, under Admiral René-Emile Godfroy, was effectively interned until 1943.

The American position towards Vichy France and Free France was inconsistent. President Roosevelt disliked and distrusted de Gaulle, and agreed with Ambassador Leahy's view that he was an "apprentice dictator".

===== North Africa =====
Preparing for a landing in North Africa in late 1942, the US looked for a top French ally. It turned to Henri Giraud shortly before the landing on 8 November 1942, but he had little local support. By happenstance the Vichy leader Admiral François Darlan was captured and supported the Americans. The Allies, with General Dwight D. Eisenhower in charge, signed a deal with Admiral Darlan on 22 November 1942 in which the Allies recognized Darlan as high commissioner for North Africa and West Africa. The Allied world was stunned at giving a high command to man who days before had been collaborating with the Nazis; Roosevelt and Churchill supported Eisenhower, for he was following a plan that had been worked out in London and had been approved by Roosevelt and Churchill. Darlan was assassinated on 24 December 1942, so Washington turned again towards Giraud, who was made High Commissioner of French North and West Africa. Giraud failed to build a political base and was displaced by the last man with any standing, de Gaulle.

==== Free France ====
General de Gaulle speaking on BBC Radio during the war

Free France was the insurgent French government based in London and the overseas French colonies and led by charismatic general Charles de Gaulle. De Gaulle had been a Secretary of state in the last constitutional government in the French Third Republic. From London on 18 June 1940 he gave an impassioned radio address exhorting the patriotic French people to resist Nazi Germany He organized the Free French Forces from soldiers that had escaped with the British at Dunkirk. With British military support the Free French gradually gained control of all French colonies except Indochina, which the Japanese controlled. The US, Britain and Canada wanted Vichy to keep nominal control of the small islands of St. Pierre and Miquelon for reasons of prestige, but de Gaulle seized them anyway in late 1941.

When the British and Americans landed in France in June 1944 de Gaulle headed a government in exile based in London, but he continued to create diplomatic problems for the US and Britain. He refused to allow French soldiers to land on D-Day, and insisted that France be treated as a great power by the other Allies, and that he himself was the only representative of France. Churchill, caught between the US and de Gaulle, tried to find a compromise. The US and Britain allowed de Gaulle the honor of being the first to march into Paris at the head of his army after the Germans had fled.

== Axis ==
Animation of the European Theatre

The dictators of Germany and Italy, Hitler and Mussolini, had numerous conferences. Neither ever met with top Japanese leaders. The Japanese ambassador to Germany handled many of the negotiations between Germany and Japan, but his coded messages home were intercepted and decrypted by the United States starting in 1941. The US shared them with Britain. They revealed important German plans.

=== Germany ===
Germany's foreign policy during the war involved the creation of friendly governments under direct or indirect control from Berlin. A main goal was obtaining soldiers from the senior allies, such as Italy and Hungary, and millions of workers and ample food supplies from subservient allies such as Vichy France. By the fall of 1942, there were 24 divisions from Romania on the Eastern Front, 10 from Italy and 10 from Hungary. When a country was no longer dependable, Germany would assume full control, as it did with France in 1942, Italy in 1943, and Hungary in 1944. Full control allowed the Nazis to achieve their high priority of mass murdering all Jewish population. Although Japan was officially a powerful ally, the relationship was distant and there was little coordination or cooperation, such as Germany's refusal to share the secret formula for making synthetic oil from coal until late in the war.

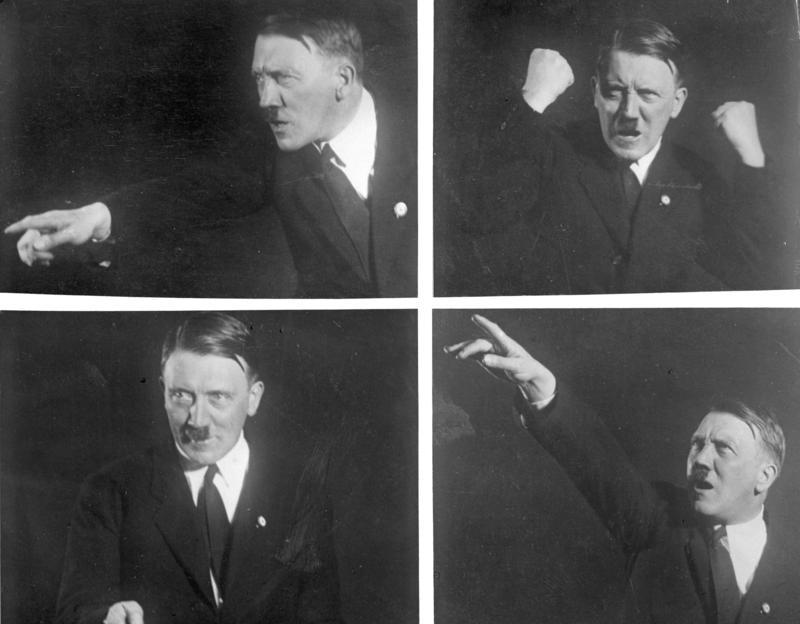
Hitler in action

DiNardo argues that in Europe Germany's foreign-policy was dysfunctional during the war, as Hitler treated each ally separately, and refused to create any sort of combined staff that would synchronize policies, armaments, and strategies. Italy, Finland, Romania, and Hungary each dealt with Berlin separately, and never coordinated their activities. Germany was reluctant to share its powerful weapons systems, or to train Axis officers. There were some exceptions, such as the close collaboration between the German and Italian forces in North Africa.

==== Hitler ====
Hitler devoted most of his attention during the war to military and diplomatic affairs. He frequently met with foreign leaders, such as on January 10, 1943, where he met with Romanian Premier Marshal Ion Antonescu at German field headquarters, with top-ranking generals on both sides. On 9 August 1943, Hitler summoned Tsar Boris III of Bulgaria to a stormy meeting at field headquarters, and demanded he declare war on the Soviet Union. The tsar refused, but did agree to declare war on far-away Britain. American news reports stated that Hitler tried to hit him and the tsar suffered a heart attack at the meeting; he died three weeks later.

==== Forced labour ====
German policy was not to use or build factories in occupied Eastern Europe but to move millions of workers into German factories and farms. Some were forced, some went voluntarily (going in search of food), and others were prisoners of war. They were closely watched, had poor food and housing, and were harshly treated. Their morale and levels of output were mediocre or poor. At the peak the forced labourers comprised 20% of the German work force. Counting deaths and turnover, about 15 million individuals were forced labourers at one point or another during the war. Most came from Poland, the Soviet Union and other Eastern areas; all were repatriated at war's end. Vichy France was one of the few countries that was able to have much influence on German policies, as it tried to protect the nearly two million French soldiers held as POWs inside Germany. Vichy arranged a deal whereby Germany would release one POW for every three Frenchmen who volunteered to work in Germany.

==== Threatening Poland ====
Before coming to power, Hitler on his part denounced the right of Poland to independence writing that Poles and Czechs are a "rabble not worth a penny more than the inhabitants of Sudan or China. How can they demand the rights of independent states?", and demanding a new partition of Poland with nationalist Russia. Referring to the restoration of the Polish state, Hitler stated "the creation of the Polish state was the greatest crime ever committed against the German nation". In January 1934 Germany signed a non aggression pact with Poland followed by trade later in the year, while secretly organizing preparations in the following years for invasion of Poland and mass murder of the Polish population. By the spring Hitler was openly pondering what inducements he might have to offer to obtain a military alliance with Poland. Between 1919 and 1939 Poland pursued a policy of balance between the Soviet Union and Nazi Germany and obtained non-aggression treaties with the former.

In early 1939 Hitler wanted Poland to join the Anti-Comintern Pact as a junior partner to help with the German invasion of the Soviet Union. Steiner states that Hitler "wanted to broker an agreement with Colonel Beck, Poland's all-powerful foreign minister, which would bring Danzig and the Polish Corridor back into the Reich but keep Poland as a friend." Hitler offered Poland a new non-aggression pact and recognition of its current frontiers if it agreed to permit the German-inhabited city of Danzig to return to Germany as well as allow an extraterritorial highway connecting Germany proper with Danzig and East Prussia going through Polish territory. This would mean effectively annexing Polish territory while cutting off Poland from the sea and its main trade route. The Polish administration distrusted Hitler and saw the plan as a threat to Polish sovereignty, practically subordinating Poland to the Axis and the Anti-Comintern Bloc while reducing the country to a state of near-servitude as its entire trade would be dependent on Germany. Robert Coulondre, the French ambassador in Berlin in a dispatch to the Foreign Minister Georges Bonnet wrote on 30 April 1939 that Hitler sought:

a mortgage on Polish foreign policy, while itself retaining complete liberty of action allowing the conclusion of political agreements with other countries. In these circumstances, the new settlement proposed by Germany, which would link the questions of Danzig and of the passage across the Corridor with counterbalancing questions of a political nature, would only serve to aggravate this mortgage and practically subordinate Poland to the Axis and the Anti-Comintern Bloc. Warsaw refused this in order to retain its independence. By March Hitler had given up on the Poles and in April began planning an invasion. Hitler's offers are described by Max Domarus as an attempt to buy time before going against Poland.

Poland had few friends in the international arena. Two critical developments caught Poland by surprise. At the end of March 1939 Britain and France announced that if Germany invaded Poland they would declare war. In terms of helping Poland militarily in an actual war, everyone realized very little could be done because the British and French military thought that if Germany invaded "Polish resistance would collapse in the early stages of fighting." Neither "was thinking of any major offensive action in the West." Their hope was that the threat of a two-front war would deter Germany. Hitler believed that Britain and France were bluffing, but he handled the Soviet problem in late August, by an alliance agreement with Stalin, which included secret provisions to partition Poland—and indeed divide up much of eastern Europe. The British and French offer was not a bluff—they did indeed declare war on Germany when it invaded Poland on 1 September, but neither was in a position to provide serious help.

Poland had a million-man army, but fell far short in terms of leadership, training, and equipment. The Polish military budget was about 2% of Germany's; its commanding general, Marshal Smigly-Rydz was not well prepared for the challenge. The Soviet Red Army then invaded Poland without a formal declaration of war on 17 September 1939, immediately after the undeclared war between the Soviet Union and Japan at the Battles of Khalkhin Gol (Nomonhan) in the Far East had ended. Poland was then partitioned between Germany and the Soviet Union.

During the war, Nazi Germany cultivated relationships with fascist and extreme right groups in neutral and Allied-controlled territory such as the Ossewabrandwag, an Afrikaner paramilitary organisation based on the Nazi Party.

==== The Holocaust ====
The Holocaust was the genocide of European Jews during the war. Between 1941 and 1945, Nazi Germany, aided by non-German collaborators, systematically murdered some six million Jews across German-occupied Europe, around two-thirds of Europe's Jewish population. Germany implemented the persecution in escalating stages. As the invasions took place, the Nazis set up new ghettos and thousands of camps and other detention sites. Finally in Berlin in January 1942 a policy was decided called the Final Solution to the Jewish question. Under the coordination of the SS, with directions from the highest leadership of the Nazi Party, killings were committed within Germany itself, throughout occupied Europe, and within territories controlled by Germany's allies. Paramilitary death squads called Einsatzgruppen, in cooperation with the German Army and local collaborators, murdered around 1.3 million Jews in mass shootings and pogroms between 1941 and 1945. By mid-1942, victims were being deported from ghettos across Europe in sealed freight trains to extermination camps where, if they survived the journey, they were gassed, worked or beaten to death, or killed by disease, medical experiments, or during death marches. The killing continued until the war ended in May 1945.

The European Jews were targeted for extermination as part of a larger policy in which Germany and its collaborators persecuted and murdered millions of others, including ethnic Poles, Soviet civilians, Soviet prisoners of war, the Roma, the disabled, Jehovah's Witnesses, political dissidents, gay men, and Black Germans.

There were numerous prominent individuals in Britain who tried to get the Churchill government to make stopping the Holocaust a priority. That never happened and the government did not publicize the information it did have about ongoing atrocities.

In Washington President Roosevelt, sensitive to the importance of his Jewish constituency, consulted with Jewish leaders. He followed their advice to not emphasize the Holocaust for fear of inciting anti-semitism in the US. Historians argue that after Pearl Harbor:

Roosevelt and his military and diplomatic advisers sought to unite the nation and blunt Nazi propaganda by avoiding the appearance of fighting a war for the Jews. They tolerated no potentially divisive initiatives or any diversion from their campaign to win the war as quickly and decisively as possible. ... Success on the battlefield, Roosevelt and his advisers believed, was the only sure way to save the surviving Jews of Europe.

Swedish diplomat Raoul Wallenberg used his diplomatic immunity to rescue many of Budapest's Jews by issuing protective passports in 1944. Although these documents had no standing in international law, they did impress those who inspected them and helped about 80,000 Jews escape. Pope Pius XII opposed the Holocaust but the Vatican made only half-hearted ineffective efforts that Berlin easily ignored.

Turkish diplomat Selahattin Ülkümen, in Rhodes, took advantage of being a neutral country to the war and saved the Jews on the island from genocide by granting them Turkish citizenship. In 1945, when Turkey broke its neutrality against Germany, this consulate building was the first Turkish territory bombed by the Nazis, as if out of a desire for revenge, and the consul's pregnant wife was one of the Turks who died in this attack.

=== Italy ===
Allied policy was to be friendly with Benito Mussolini, the Fascist dictator of Italy, in the hopes he would either remain neutral or moderate Hitler's expansion plans. However, in May 1939, he joined the Axis with Germany, signing the Pact of Steel. When France was in the last stages of collapse Mussolini entered the war and gained some spoils. He brought along a powerful navy that could challenge the British for control of the Mediterranean. Roosevelt denounced the move: "On this 10th day of June, 1940, the hand that held the dagger has struck it into the back of its neighbor."

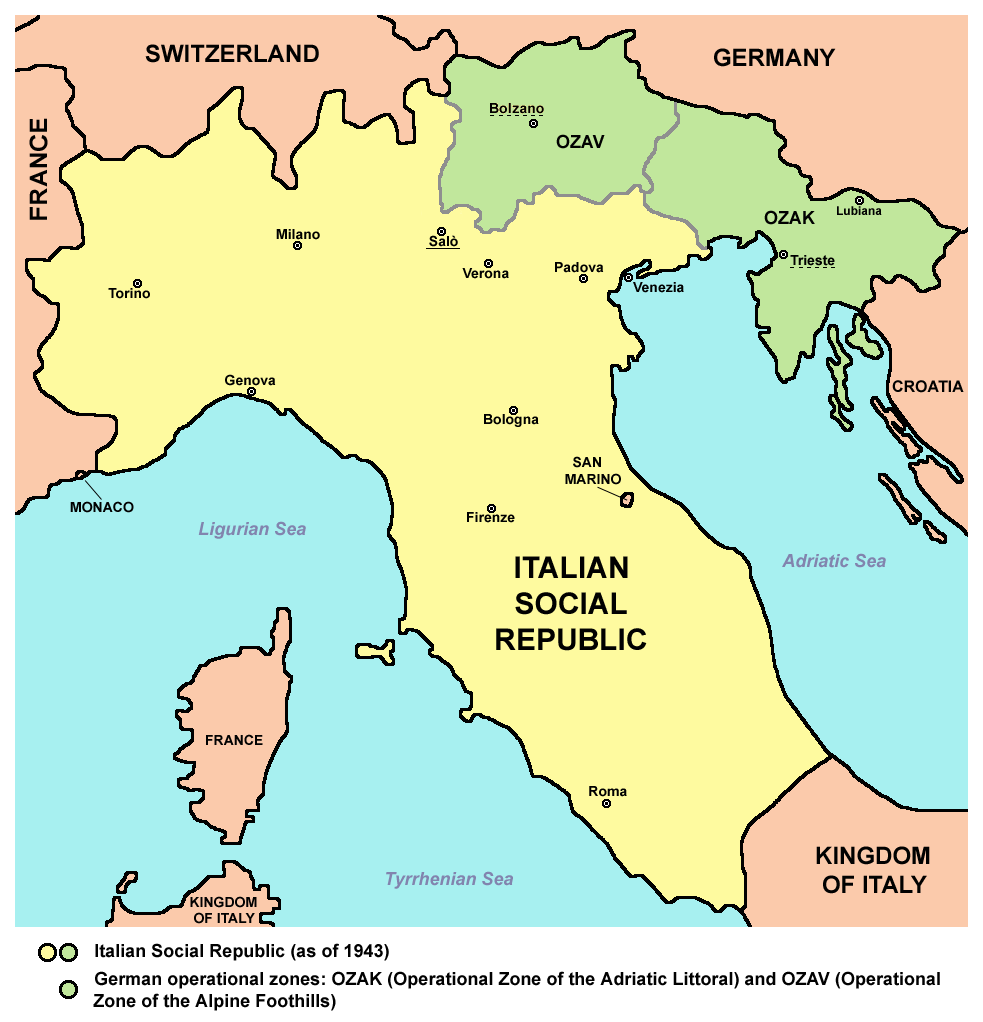
Italian Social Republic (RSI) as of 1943 German military operational zones (OZAV/OZAK) under direct German administration

Italy was poorly prepared for war and increasingly fell under Nazi dictation. After initial success in British Somaliland, Egypt, the Balkans (despite the initial defeat against Greece), and eastern fronts, Italian military efforts failed in North and East Africa, and Germany had to intervene to rescue its neighbor. After the Allies invaded and took Sicily and southern Italy in 1943, the regime collapsed. Mussolini was arrested and the King appointed General Pietro Badoglio as new Prime Minister. They later signed the armistice of Cassibile and banned the Fascist Party. However Germany moved in, with the Fascists' help, occupying Italy north of Naples. German paratroopers rescued Mussolini and Hitler set him up as head of a puppet government the Italian Social Republic, often called the Salò Republic; a civil war resulted. The Germans gave way slowly, for mountainous Italy offered many defensive opportunities.

Britain by 1944 feared that Italy would become a communist state under Soviet influence. It abandoned its original concept of British hegemony in Italy and substituted for it a policy of support for an independent Italy with a high degree of American influence.

=== Balkans ===
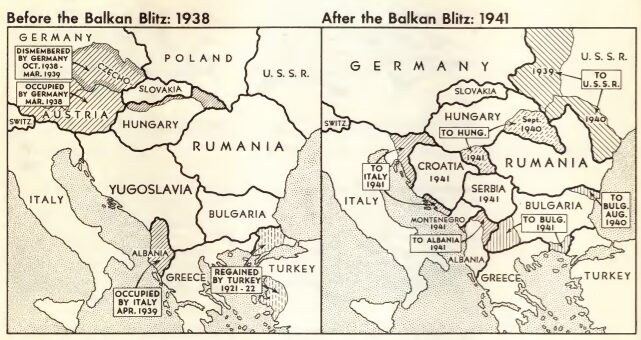

Hitler, preparing to invade the Soviet Union, diverted attention to make sure the southern or Balkan flank was secure. Romania was under heavy pressure, and had to cede 40,000 square miles of territory with 4 million people to the USSR, Hungary and Bulgaria; German troops came in to protect the vital oil fields (Germany's only source of oil besides the USSR). Romania signed the Axis Pact and became a German ally (November 1940). So too did Hungary (November 1940) and Bulgaria (March, 1941).

==== Greece ====
Greek counteroffensive against Italian-controlled Albania, late 1940.

In spring 1939, Italy occupied and annexed Albania. Britain tried to deter an invasion by guaranteeing Greece's frontiers. Greece, under the dictatorship of Ioannis Metaxas, to support the Allies' interests rejected Italian demands. Italy invaded Greece on 28 October 1940, but Greeks repelled the invaders after a bitter struggle (see Greco-Italian War). By mid-December, 1940, the Greeks occupied nearly a quarter of Albania, tying down 530,000 Italian troops. Metaxas tended to favor Germany but after he died in January 1941 Greece accepted British troops and supplies. In March 1941, a major Italian counterattack failed, humiliating Italian military pretensions.

Germany needed to secure its strategic southern flank in preparation for an invasion of the USSR, Hitler reluctantly launched the Battle of Greece in April 1941. Axis troops successfully invaded through Yugoslavia, quickly overcoming Greek and British defenders. Greece was partitioned under German, Italian, and Bulgarian occupation. A Greek government-in-exile was formed in Cairo (it moved to London), and Germany set up a puppet government in Athens. The latter attracted numerous anti-communist elements.

Wartime conditions were severe for civilians; famine was rampant as grain production plunged and Germany seized food supplies for its own needs. Malaria became epidemic. The Germans retaliated brutally for sabotage by the Greek Resistance. Multiple resistance groups organized, but they often opposed each other. They included the National Republican Greek League (EDES), the National and Social Liberation (EKKA). Strongest of all was the communist National Liberation Front (EAM); its military arm, the National Popular Liberation Army (ELAS) had 50,000 soldiers. The rivalries set the stage for a civil war after the Germans left in September 1944.

==== Yugoslavia and Croatia ====
Yugoslavia signed on as a German ally in March 1941, but within days an anti-Nazi coup, led by Serbians with British help, overthrew the prince regent, repudiated the Nazis, and installed the 17-year-old heir as King Peter II.

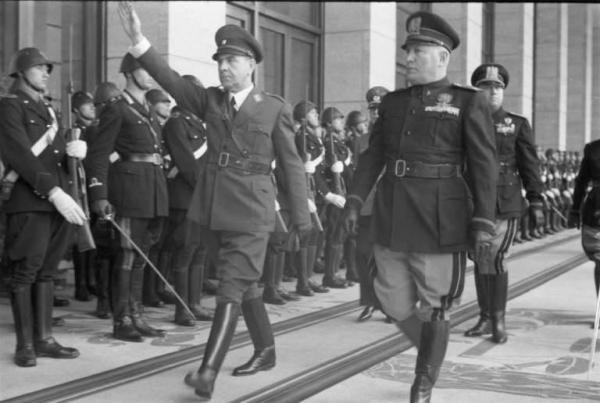
Croatia's dictator Ante Pavelić (left) with Mussolini in 1941; Independent State of Croatia (not to be confused with the present-day Republic of Croatia) was a new Axis state

Germany immediately bombarded the capital Belgrade and invaded in force on April 6. Within days the Germans were in full control; the new king fled as did many party leaders. However some prominent politicians supported the Germans, and others were passive. The German invasion set off an extremely bloody, long civil war that killed over a million people. Germany dismembered Yugoslavia, with slices going to Germany and Italy. Kosovo was given to Albania (then under Italian control). Macedonia went to Bulgaria and Bačka, Baranja, Međimurje and Prekmurje was given over to Hungary. Serbia became a German puppet state and was the cockpit of the resistance. In Slovenia, Germans deported Slovenes to Serbia, enrolled them in the German army, or deported them to Germany to work in war factories and labor camps. In Serbia the Germans set up General Milan Nedić in charge of a "government of national salvation" but did not permit it to maintain a regular army or foreign affairs ministry.

What was left of Yugoslavia became the new Independent State of Croatia (NDH) under the rule of Ante Pavelić and his fascist Ustashe party. It became an Axis ally and controlled Croatia, Bosnia, and Herzegovina. The Ustaše murdered around 90,000 people (mostly Serbs, along with 37,000 Jews), expelled 250,000, and forced another 200,000 to convert to Catholicism.

Two major anti-German anti-fascist guerrilla movements emerged, the first in Europe self-organised anti-fascist movement (started in Croatia) partisans led by a Croat Josip Broz Tito had the initial support from the Kremlin. The Chetniks led by the Serbian chetnik Colonel Draža Mihailović was loyal to the royal government in exile based in London. Tito's movement won out in 1945, executed its enemies, and reunited Yugoslavia.

=== Japan ===
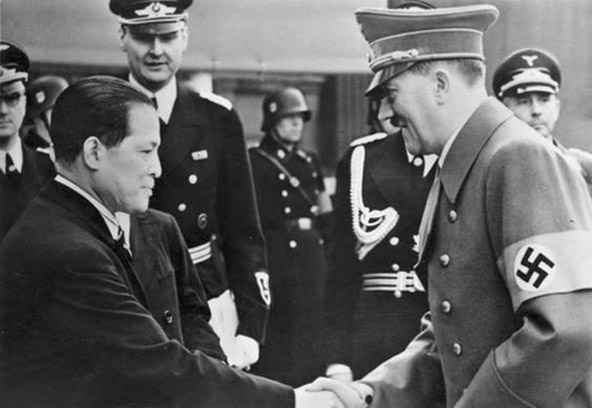
Adolf Hitler meeting Japanese ambassador to Germany Hiroshi Ōshima, 1942

Japan had conquered all of Manchuria and most of China by 1939 in the Second Sino-Japanese War, but the Allies refused to recognize the conquests. Japan joined the Axis with Germany, but shared little information. Japan depended on imports from the Allies for 90% of its oil, and the cutoff of oil shipments in mid-1941 left Japan with supplies for only a year or two of serious combat by its warships and warplanes unless it came to terms regarding China, or seized oil fields controlled by Britain and the Netherlands. The latter course meant war, and was urged by army officials who had been bloodied in border conflicts and were reluctant to engage the Soviets. Some admirals and many civilians, including Prime Minister Konoe Fumimaro, believed that a war with the US would end in defeat. The alternative was loss of honor and power. Diplomats proposed political compromises in the form of the "Amau Doctrine", dubbed the "Japanese Monroe Doctrine" which would have given the Japanese free rein with regard to China. These proposals were rejected by the US; the Imperial Japanese Army now demanded a military solution.

==== Imperial conquests ====
The Greater East Asia Co-Prosperity Sphere in 1942.

Japan launched its own blitzkriegs in East Asia. In 1937, the Japanese Army invaded and captured most of the coastal Chinese cities such as Shanghai. Japan took over French Indochina (Vietnam, Laos, Cambodia), British Malaya (Brunei, Malaysia, Singapore) as well as the Dutch East Indies (Indonesia). Thailand managed to stay independent by becoming a satellite state of Japan. In December 1941 to May 1942, Japan sank major elements of the American, British and Dutch fleets, captured Hong Kong, Singapore, the Philippines and the Dutch East Indies, and reached the borders of India and began bombing Australia. Japan suddenly had achieved its goal of ruling the Greater East Asia Co-Prosperity Sphere.

==== Imperial rule ====
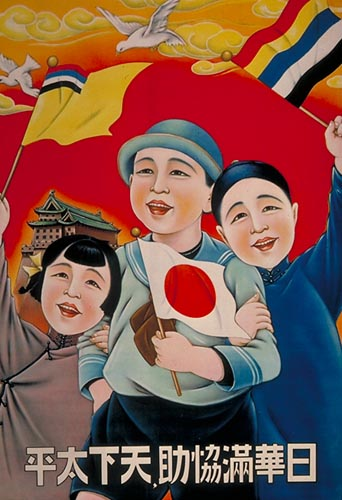
1935 poster of the puppet state of Manchukuo promoting harmony among peoples. The caption reads: "With the help of Japan, China, and Manchukuo, the world can be in peace."

The ideology of Japan's colonial empire, as it expanded dramatically during the war, contained two contradictory impulses. On the one hand, it preached the unity of the Greater East Asia Co-Prosperity Sphere, a coalition of Asian races, directed by Japan, against Western imperialism. This approach celebrated the spiritual values of the East in opposition to the "crass" materialism of the West. In practice, it was a euphemistic title for grabbing land and acquiring essential natural resources. The Japanese installed organizationally-minded bureaucrats and engineers to run their new empire, and they believed in ideals of efficiency, modernization, and engineering solutions to social problems. It was fascism based on technology, and rejected Western norms of democracy. After 1945, the engineers and bureaucrats took over, and turned the wartime techno-fascism into entrepreneurial management skills.

The Japanese government established puppet regimes in Manchuria ("Manchukuo") and China proper; they vanished at the end of the war. The Japanese Army operated ruthless governments in most of the conquered areas, but paid more favorable attention to the Dutch East Indies. The main goal was to obtain oil, but Japan sponsored an Indonesian nationalist movement under Sukarno. Sukarno finally came to power in the late 1940s after several years of battling the Dutch. The Dutch destroyed their oil wells but the Japanese reopened them. However most of the tankers taking oil to Japan were sunk by American submarines, so Japan's oil shortage became increasingly acute.

==== Puppet states in China ====
Japan set up puppet regimes in Manchuria ("Manchukuo") and China proper; they vanished at the end of the war.

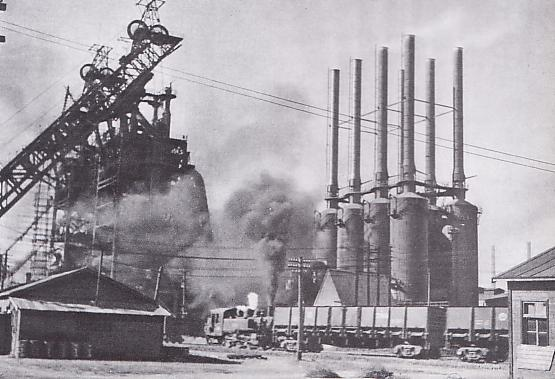
Shōwa Steel Works was a mainstay of the Economy of Manchukuo

Manchuria, the historic homeland of the Qing dynasty, had an ambiguous character after 1912. It was run by local warlords. The Japanese Army seized control in 1931, and set up a puppet state of Manchukuo in 1932 for the 34,000,000 inhabitants. Other areas were added, and over 800,000 Japanese moved in as administrators. The nominal ruler was Puyi, who as a small child had been the last Emperor of China. He was deposed during the revolution of 1911, and now the Japanese brought him back in a powerless role. Manchukuo was recognized mainly by Axis countries. The United States in 1932 announced the Stimson Doctrine stating that it would never recognize Japanese sovereignty. Japan modernized the economy and operated it as a satellite to the Japanese economy. It was out of range of American bombers, so its factories continued their output to the end. Manchukuo was returned to China in 1945.

When Japan seized control of China proper in 1937–38, the Japanese Central China Expeditionary Army set up the Reorganized National Government of China, a puppet state, under the nominal leadership of Wang Ching-wei (1883–1944). It was based in Nanjing. The Japanese were in full control; the puppet state declared war on the Allies in 1943. Wang was allowed to administer the International Settlement in Shanghai. The puppet state had an army of 900,000 soldiers, and was positioned against the Nationalist army under Chiang Kai-shek. It did little fighting.

==== Military defeats ====
The attack on Pearl Harbor initially appeared to be a major success that knocked out the American battle fleet—but it missed the aircraft carriers that were at sea and ignored vital shore facilities whose destruction could have crippled US Pacific operations. Ultimately, the attack proved a long-term strategic disaster that actually inflicted relatively little significant long-term damage while provoking the United States to seek revenge in an all-out total war in which no terms short of unconditional surrender would be entertained.

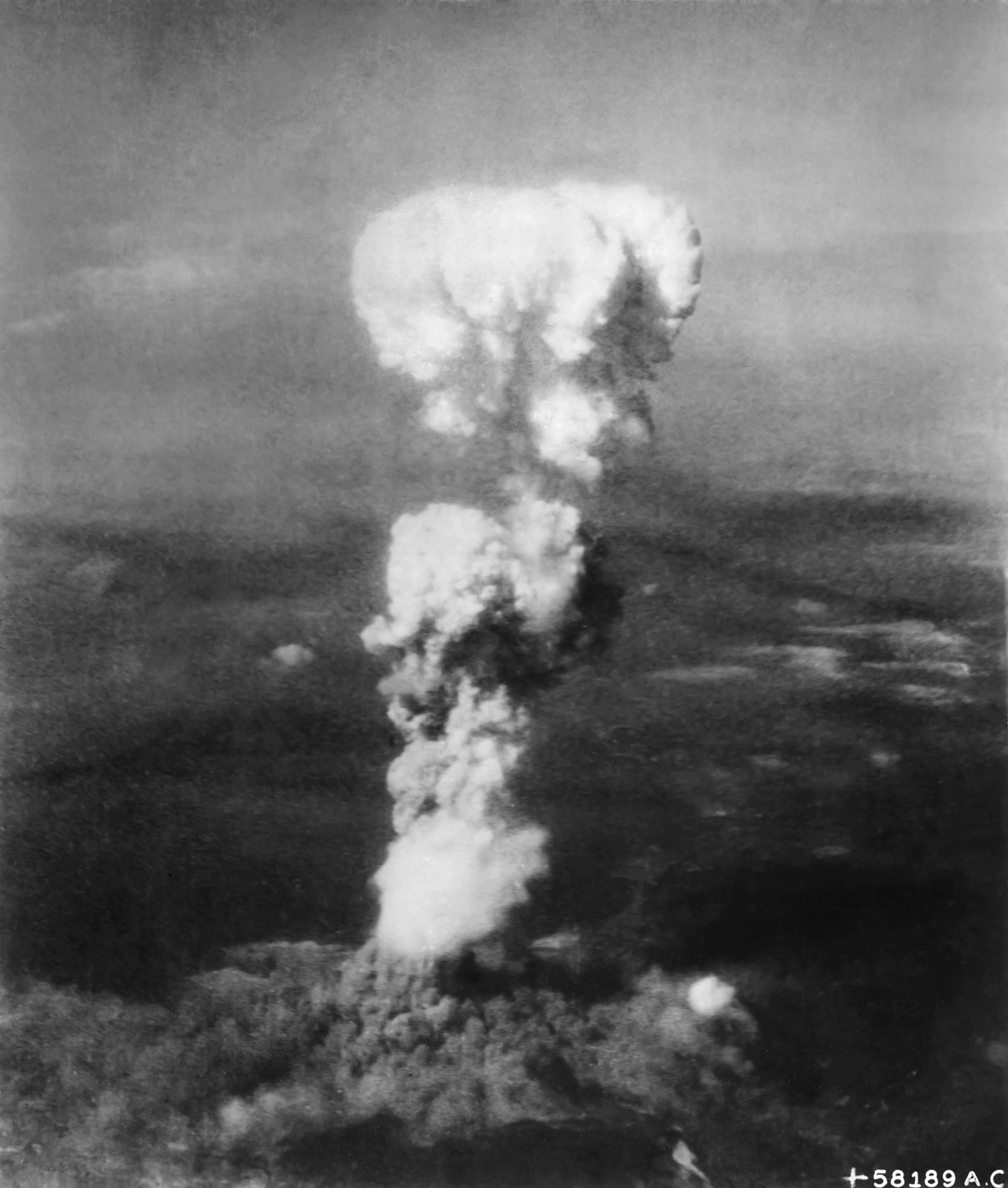
Atomic cloud over Hiroshima, 1945

However, as Admiral Isoroku Yamamoto warned, Japan's six-month window of military advantage following Pearl Harbor ended with the Imperial Japanese Navy's offensive ability being crippled at the hands of the American Navy in the Battle of Midway. As the war became one of mass production and logistics, the US built a far stronger navy with more numerous warplanes, and a superior communications and logistics system. The Japanese had stretched too far and were unable to supply their forward bases—many soldiers died of starvation. Japan built warplanes in large quantity but the quality plunged, and the performance of poorly trained pilots spiraled downward. The Imperial Navy lost a series of major battles, from Midway (1942) to the Philippine Sea (1944) and Leyte Gulf (1945), which put American long-range B-29 bombers in range. A series of massive raids burned out much of Tokyo and 64 major industrial cities beginning in March 1945 while Operation Starvation seriously disrupted the nation's vital internal shipping lanes. Regardless of how the war was becoming hopeless, the circle around the Emperor held fast and refused to open negotiations. Finally in August, two atomic bombs and the Soviet invasion of Manchuria demonstrated the cause was futile, and Hirohito authorized a surrender whereby he kept his throne.

==== Deaths ====
Total Japanese military fatalities between 1937 and 1945 were 2.1 million; most came in the last year of the war. Starvation or malnutrition-related illness accounted for roughly 80 percent of Japanese military deaths in the Philippines, and 50 percent of military fatalities in China. The aerial bombing of a total of 65 Japanese cities appears to have taken a minimum of 400,000 and possibly closer to 600,000 civilian lives (over 100,000 in Tokyo alone, over 200,000 in Hiroshima and Nagasaki combined, and 80,000–150,000 civilian deaths in the battle of Okinawa). Civilian death among settlers who died attempting to return to Japan from Manchuria in the winter of 1945 were probably around 100,000.

=== Finland ===
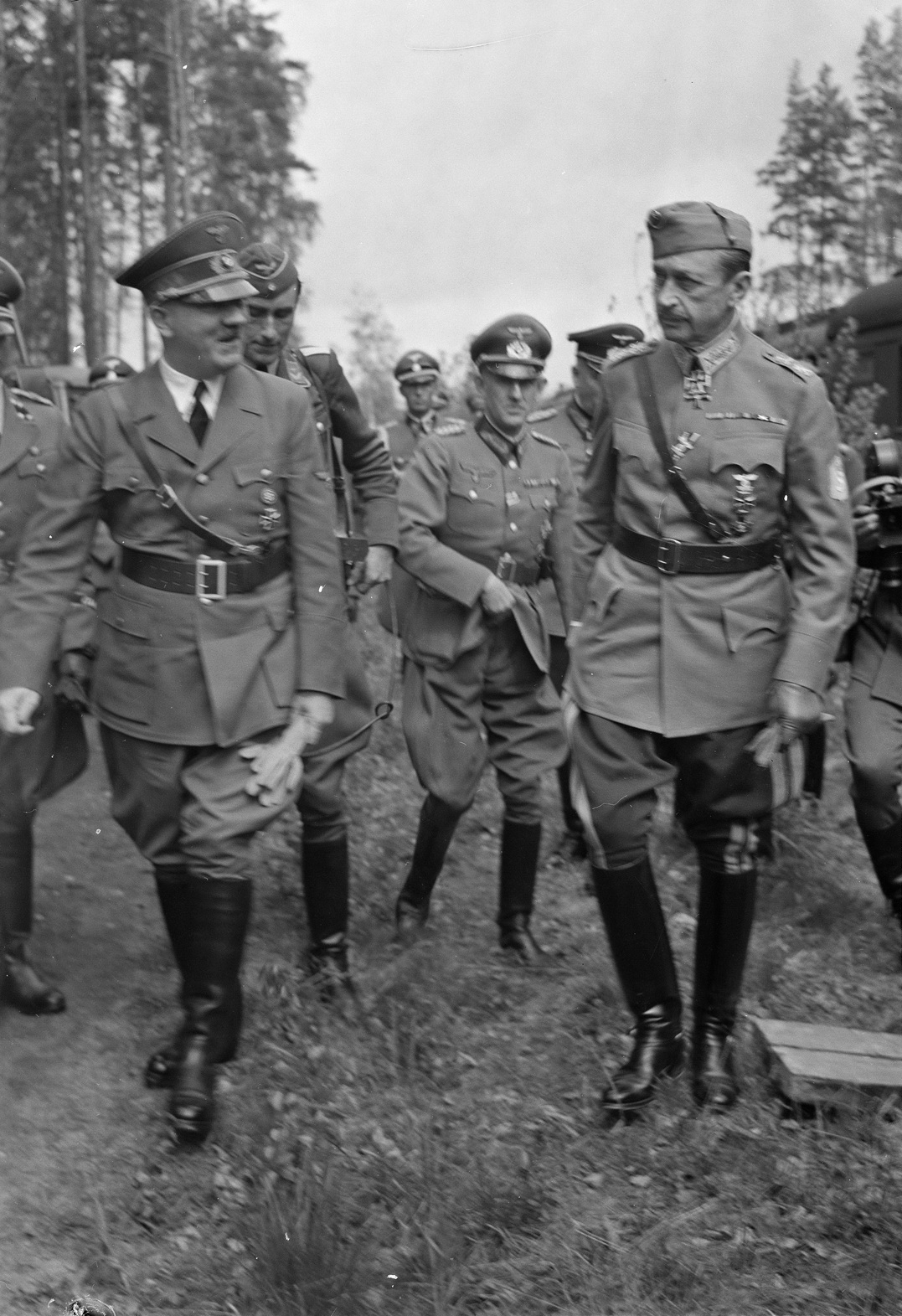
Hitler and Finnish commander-in-chief Field Marshal Mannerheim (right)

Finland fought against the USSR twice, first when the USSR invaded in 1939 and then from 1941 through 1944 when Finland teamed with Germany to recapture Karelia. As per the Soviet armistice in late summer of 1944, they successfully drove German forces out of Lapland at the end of 1944.

The August 1939 Molotov–Ribbentrop Pact between Germany and the Soviet Union contained a secret protocol dividing much of eastern Europe and assigning Finland to the Soviet sphere of influence. Finland before 1918 had been a Grand Duchy of Russia, and many Finnish speakers lived in neighboring parts of the Soviet Union. After unsuccessfully attempting to force territorial and other concessions on the Finns, the Soviet Union invaded Finland in November 1939 starting the Winter War. Finland won very wide popular support in Britain and the United States.

Soviet success in Finland would threaten Germany's iron-ore supplies and offered the prospect of Allied interference in the region. The Soviets overwhelmed the Finnish resistance in the Winter War, and a peace treaty was signed in March 1940. It ceded some Finnish territory to the Soviet Union, including the Karelian Isthmus, containing Finland's second-largest city, Viipuri, and the critical defensive structure of the Mannerheim Line.

Following the Winter War, Finland sought protection and support from Britain and Sweden without success. Finland drew closer to Germany, first with the intent of enlisting German support as a counterweight to thwart continuing Soviet pressure, and later to help regain lost territories. Finland declared war against the Soviet Union on 25 June 1941 in what is called the "Continuation War" in Finnish historiography. To meet Stalin's demands, Britain reluctantly declared war on Finland on 6 December 1941, although no other military operations followed. War was never declared between Finland and the United States, though relations were severed between the two countries in 1944 as a result of the Ryti–Ribbentrop Agreement. The arms-length collaboration with Germany stemmed from a precarious balance struck by the Finns in order to avoid antagonizing Britain and the United States. In the end Britain declared war to satisfy the needs of its Soviet policy, but did not engage in combat against Finland. Finland concluded armistice negotiations with the USSR under strong German pressure to continue the war, while British and American acted in accord with their own alliances with the Soviets.

Finland maintained command of its armed forces and pursued war objectives independently of Germany. Germans and Finns did work closely together during Operation Silverfox, a joint offensive against Murmansk. Finland refused German requests to participate actively in the Siege of Leningrad, and also granted asylum to Jews, while Jewish soldiers continued to serve in its army.

After Soviet offensives were fought to a standstill, in 1944 Ryti's successor as president, Marshall Carl Gustaf Emil Mannerheim, opened negotiations with the Soviets, which resulted in the Moscow Armistice on 19 September 1944. Under its terms Finland was obliged to remove or intern any remaining German troops on Finnish territory past September 15. This resulted in a military campaign to expel German forces in Lapland in the final months of 1944. Finland signed a peace treaty with the Allied powers in 1947.

=== Hungary ===
Hungary was a reluctant ally of Germany in the war. In the 1930s, the Kingdom of Hungary relied on increased trade with Fascist Italy and Nazi Germany to pull itself out of the Great Depression. Hungarian politics and foreign policy had become more stridently nationalistic by 1938, and Hungary adopted an irredentist policy, attempting to recover control over ethnic Hungarian areas in neighboring countries. Hungary benefited territorially from its relationship with the Axis. Settlements were negotiated regarding territorial disputes with the Czechoslovak Republic, the Slovak Republic and the Kingdom of Romania. In 1940, Hungary signed the Tripartite Pact. The following year, Hungarian forces participated in the invasion of Yugoslavia and the invasion of the Soviet Union. Their participation was noted by German observers for its particular cruelty, with occupied peoples subjected to arbitrary violence. Hungarian volunteers were sometimes referred to as engaging in "murder tourism".

While waging war against the Soviet Union, Prime Minister Miklós Kállay engaged in peace negotiations with the United States and the United Kingdom. Berlin was already suspicious of the Kállay government. As early as September 1943 the German General Staff had made plans to invade and occupy Hungary. The Kállay government took no preventive measures. Resistance would not have been hopeless. In March 1944, German forces occupied Hungary. When Soviet forces began threatening Hungary, Regent Miklós Horthy announced he asked for an armistice and ordered to cease military operations as Hungary jumped out of the war. Soon afterward, Horthy's son was kidnapped by German commandos and Horthy was forced to revoke his statements. The Regent was then deposed from power, while Hungarian fascist leader Ferenc Szálasi established a new government, with German backing. In 1945, Hungarian and German forces in Hungary were defeated by advancing Soviet armies.

=== Romania ===
Following the start of the war on 1 September 1939, the Kingdom of Romania under King Carol II officially adopted a position of neutrality. However, the rapidly changing situation in Europe during 1940, as well as domestic political upheaval, undermined this stance. Fascist political forces such as the Iron Guard rose in popularity and power, urging an alliance with Germany and Italy. As the military fortunes of Romania's two main guarantors of territorial integrity—France and Britain—crumbled in spring 1940, the government of Romania turned to Germany in hopes of a similar guarantee. Romania was unaware that Berlin had already secretly split Eastern Europe with Moscow in a secret protocol of the Molotov–Ribbentrop Pact.

In summer 1940 a series of territorial disputes were diplomatically resolved unfavorably to Romania, resulting in the loss of most of the territory gained in the wake of World War I. This caused the popularity of Romania's government to plummet, further reinforcing the fascist and military factions, who eventually staged a coup that turned the country into a dictatorship under Mareșal Ion Antonescu. The new regime, the National Legionary State, officially joined the Axis powers on 23 November 1940. Romania sent troops into the invasion of the Soviet Union on 22 June 1941, sold equipment and oil to Germany. It committed more troops to the Eastern Front than all the other allies of Germany combined. Romanian forces played a large role during fighting in Ukraine, Bessarabia, Stalingrad and elsewhere. Romanian troops were responsible for the persecution and massacre of up to 260,000 Jews in Romanian-controlled territories, though most Jews living within Romania survived the harsh conditions. According to historian and author Mark Axworthy, the second Axis army in Europe, arguably, belonged to Romania, though, this is disputed since many would agree that this position goes to the Italian army.

After the tide of war turned against Germany Romania was bombed by the Allies from 1943 onwards and invaded by advancing Soviet armies in 1944. Popular support for Romania's war plunged as German-Romanian fronts collapsed. King Michael of Romania led a coup d'état that deposed the Antonescu regime and put Romania on the side of the Allies for the remainder of the war; Antonescu was executed in June 1946. Despite this late association with the winning side, Greater Romania was largely dismantled, losing territory to Bulgaria and the Soviet Union, but regaining Northern Transylvania from Hungary.

== Neutrals ==
The main neutrals were Ireland, Portugal, Spain, Sweden, Switzerland and Turkey.

The Soviet Union was officially neutral until June 1941 in Europe, and until August 1945 in Asia, when it attacked Japan in cooperation with the US.

=== Latin America ===
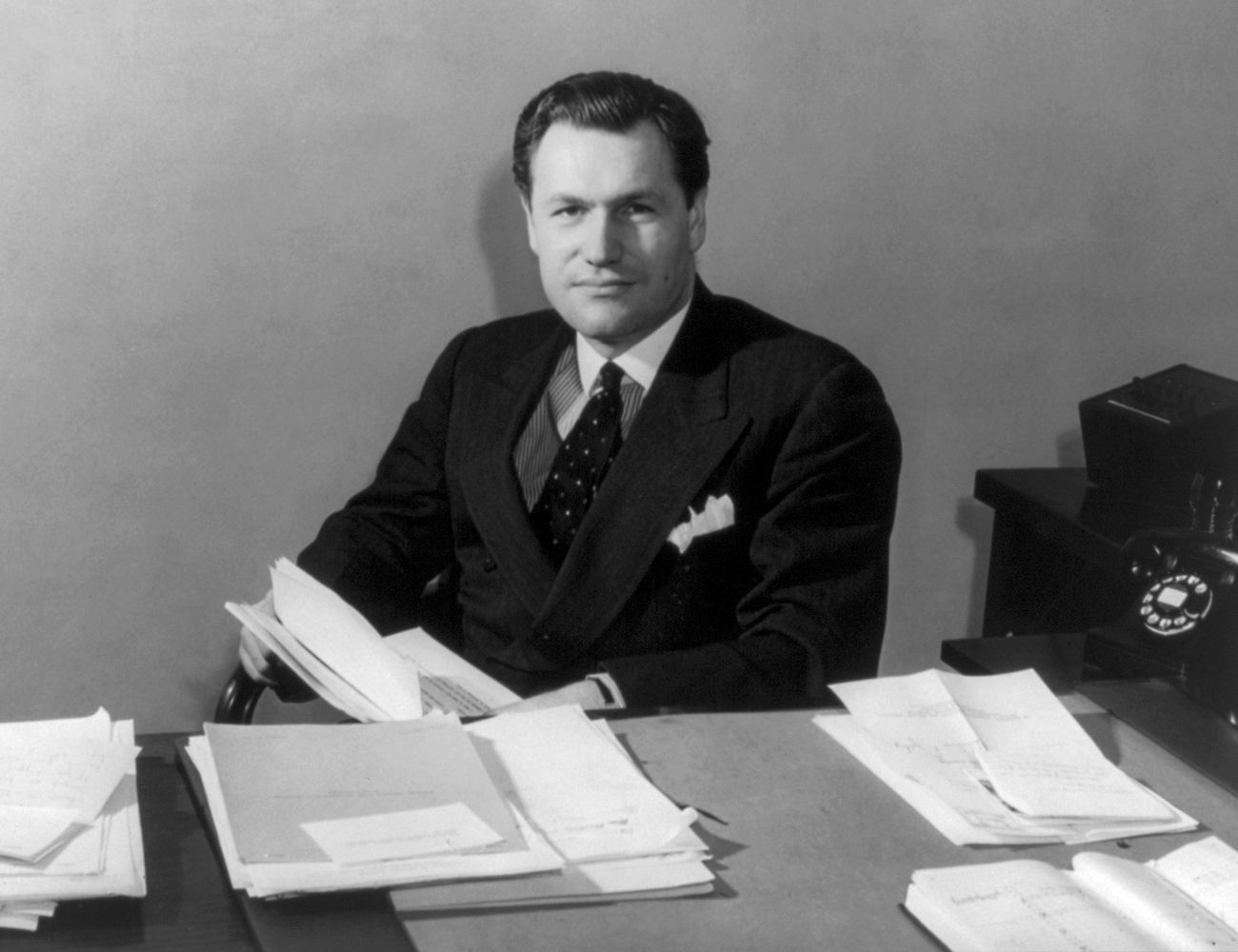
Nelson Rockefeller, appointed in August 1940 as head of the Office of the Coordinator of Inter-American Affairs (OCIAA).

The US believed, falsely, that Germany had a master plan to subvert and take control of the economy of much of South America. Washington made anti-Nazi activity a high priority in the region. By July 1941, President Franklin Delano Roosevelt authorized the creation of the Office of the Coordinator of Inter-American Affairs (OCIAA) in response to perceived propaganda efforts in Latin America by Germany and Italy. Through the use of news, film and radio broadcast media in the United States, Roosevelt sought to enhance his Good Neighbor policy, promote Pan-Americanism and forestall military hostility in Latin America through the use of cultural diplomacy. Three countries actively joined the war effort, while others passively broke relations or nominally declared war. Cuba declared war in December 1941 and actively helped in the defence of the Panama Canal. It did not send forces to Europe. Mexico declared war on Germany in 1942 after U-boats sank Mexican tankers carrying crude oil to the United States. It sent a 300-man fighter squadron to the war against Japan in 1945. Brazil declared war against Germany and Italy on 22 August 1942 and sent a 25,700-man infantry force that fought mainly on the Italian Front, from September 1944 to May 1945. Its Navy and Air Force acted in the Atlantic Ocean.

==== Argentina ====
Argentina hosted a strong, very well-organized pro-Nazi element before the war that was controlled by German ambassadors. Brazil, Chile and Mexico had smaller movements. American foreign-policy worked to unite all of Latin America in a coalition against Germany. Argentina proved recalcitrant, and the US worked to undermine the Argentine government. The American policy backfired when the military seized power in a coup in 1943. Relationships grew worse to the point that Washington seriously considered economic and diplomatic isolation of Argentina and tried unsuccessfully to keep it out of the United Nations in 1945. Historians now agree that the supposed affinity between Argentina and Germany was greatly exaggerated.

The Argentine government remained neutral until the last days of the war but quietly tolerated entry of Nazi leaders fleeing Germany, Belgium and Vichy France in 1945. Indeed, a conspiracy theory grew up after the war that greatly exaggerated the Nazi numbers and amount of gold they brought. Historians have shown there was little gold and probably not many Nazis, but the myths live on.

=== Baltic states ===
Despite declaring neutrality the Baltic states were secretly assigned to the Soviet sphere of influence via the Molotov–Ribbentrop Pact and subsequently occupied by the Soviet Union and Nazi Germany. Diplomatic legations continued to represent the Baltic states throughout the period. The United States never recognized control by Germans or USSR.

=== Ireland ===
Ireland tried to be strictly neutral during the war, and refused to allow Britain to use bases. However it had large sales of exports to Britain, and tens of thousands joined the British armed forces.

=== Portugal ===
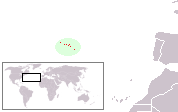
Location of the Azores Islands

Portugal controlled strategically vital Azores islands in the Atlantic, and Britain and the US made plans called Operation Alacrity to invade them if necessary. Portugal although it had an alliance with Britain was officially neutral; its highest goal was to avoid a German invasion. Its dictator António de Oliveira Salazar collaborated with the British and sold them rubber and tungsten ("wolfram"). In late 1943 he allowed the Allies to establish air bases in the Azores to fight U-boats. He helped Spain avoid German control. Tungsten was a major product, and he sold to Germany; he stopped in June 1944, when the threat of a German invasion of Portugal was no longer possible. He worked to regain control of East Timor after the Japanese seized it. He admitted several thousand Jewish refugees. Lisbon maintained air connections with Britain and the US. Lisbon was a hotbed of spies and served as the base for the International Red Cross in its distribution of relief supplies to POWs held by Germany. The Quakers and other peace groups used it as a base for their aid to refugees.

=== Spain ===
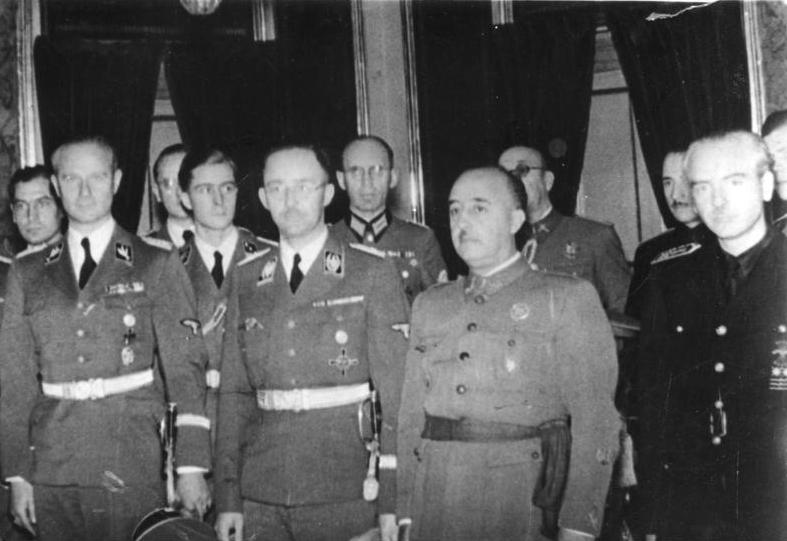
Nazi leaders (from left) Karl Wolff and Heinrich Himmler meet with Spanish dictator Francisco Franco and his Foreign Minister Ramón Serrano Suñer in Madrid, October 1940.

Nazi leaders spent much of the war attempting to persuade the Franco regime to enter the war and allow a German army to march on Gibraltar. The overtures proved futile. Franco was sympathetic but remained emphatically neutral. However, Spain did need to pay off its heavy debt to Germany. Therefore, Franco did provide various kinds of support to Italy and Germany. It sold Germany supplies, especially wolfram, the hard-to-find tungsten ore. It formed 45,000 volunteers into the Blue Division, which fought exclusively on the Eastern Front.

Spain was neutral and traded as well with the Allies. Germany had an interest in seizing the key fortress of Gibraltar, but Franco stationed his army at the French border to dissuade Germany from occupying the Iberian Peninsula. Franco displayed pragmatism and his determination to act principally in Spanish interests, in the face of Allied economic pressure, Axis military demands, and Spain's geographic isolation. As the war progressed he became more hard-line toward Germany and more accommodating to the Allies.

=== Sweden ===
At the outbreak of war between Germany and Poland, Britain and France in September 1939, Sweden declared neutrality. At outbreak of war in November between Finland and the Soviet Union, Sweden declared "Non-belligerent" to make it possible to support Finland with arms and volunteers in the Winter War. From 13 December to the end of the war, a national unity government under Prime Minister Per Albin Hansson and Foreign Minister Christian Günther was formed that included all major parties in the Riksdag.

From April 1940 Sweden and Finland was encircled between Nazi Germany and the Soviet Union and subject to both British and German blockades. In spring-summer 1940 the United States stopped delivery of fighter aircraft to Sweden. Sweden made concessions to both Allies and Germany. It held that that neutrality and cooperation with Germany were necessary for survival, for Germany was vastly more powerful, concessions were limited and were only made where the threat was too great; neutrality was bent but not broken; national unity was paramount; and in any case Sweden had the neutral right to trade with Germany. Germany needed Swedish iron and had nothing to gain—and much iron to lose—by an invasion.

As a free country, Sweden took in refugees from Finland, Norway, Denmark and the Baltic states. During the last part of the war, it was possible to save some victims from German concentration camps.

=== Switzerland ===
Switzerland was neutral and did business with both sides. It mobilized its army to defend itself against any invasion. The Germans did make plans, but never invaded. Cut off from the Allies, Swiss trade was mostly with Germany, with Swiss banks a favourite place for Nazis to store their loot. The Swiss depended on German permission to import its food and fuel. Smuggling high precision tools and weapons (such as jewel bearings, diamond dies, and chronographs) to Britain took place on a large scale. Switzerland became a convenient center for spies and espionage.

Swiss banks paid Germany 1.3 billion Swiss Francs for gold; Germany used the Francs to buy supplies on the world market. However much of the gold was looted and the Allies warned Switzerland during the war. In 1947 Switzerland paid 250 million francs in exchange for the dropping of claims relating to the Swiss role in the gold transactions.

Switzerland took in 48,000 refugees during the war, of whom 20,000 were Jewish. They also turned away about 40,000 applicants for refugee status.

Switzerland's role regarding Nazi Germany became highly controversial in the 1990s. Wylie says, "Switzerland has been widely condemned for its part in the war. It has been accused of abetting genocide, by refusing to offer sanctuary to Hitler's victims, bankrolling the Nazi war economy, and callously profiting from Hitler's murderous actions by seizing the assets of those who perished in the death camps." On the other hand, Churchill told his foreign minister in late 1944:

Of all the neutrals, Switzerland has the great right to distinction. She has been the sole international force linking the hideous-sundered nations and ourselves. What does it matter whether she has been able to give us the commercial advantages we desire or has given too many to the German, to keep herself alive? She has been a democratic state, standing for freedom in self defence among her mountains, and in thought, despite of race, largely on our side.

=== Turkey ===
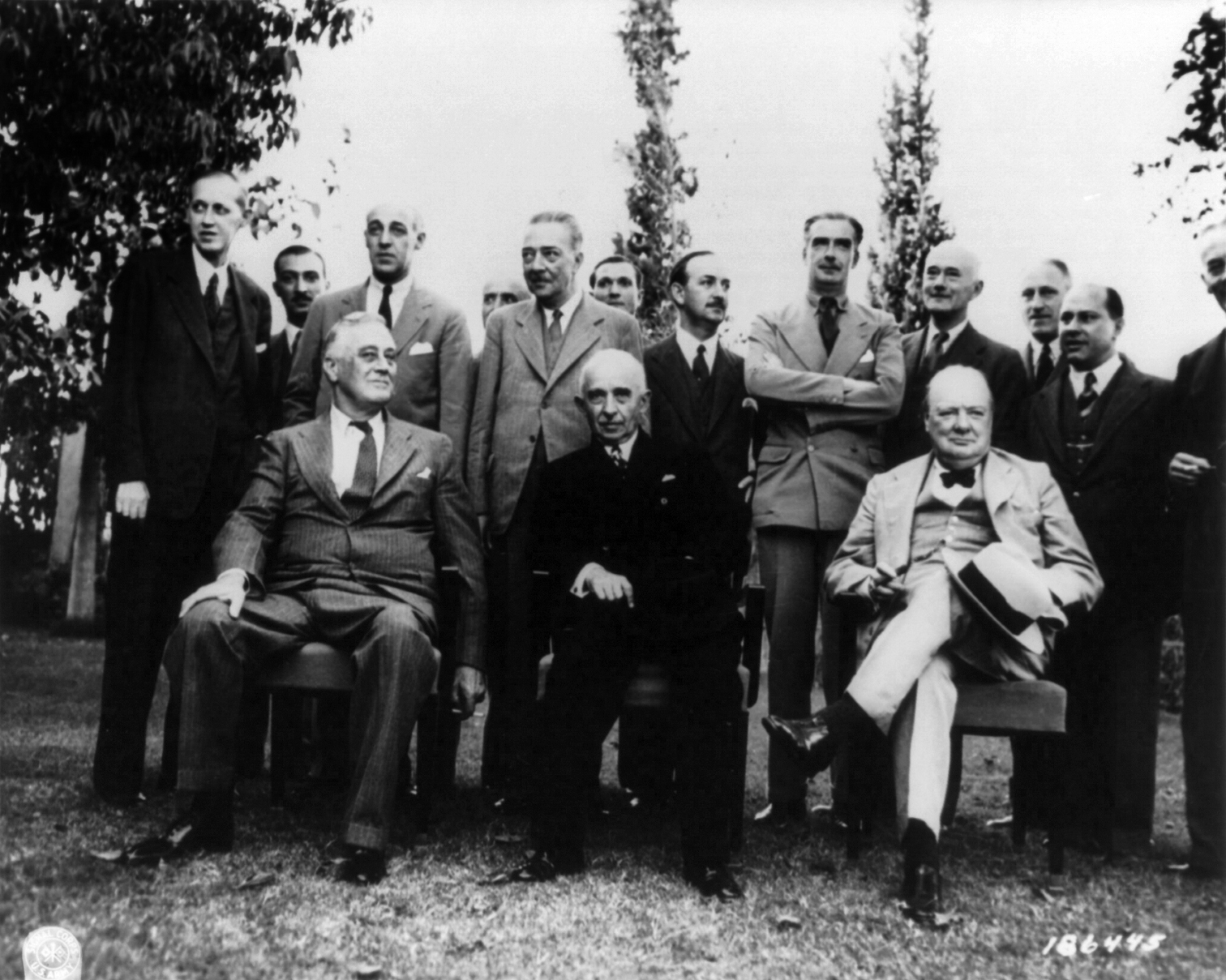
Roosevelt, İnönü of Turkey and Churchill at the Second Cairo Conference which was held between December 4–6, 1943.

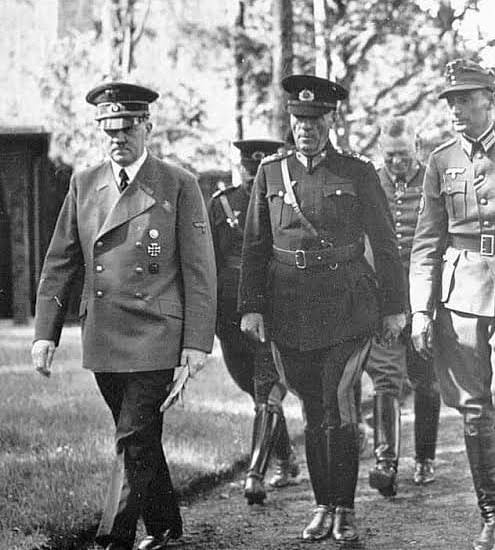
Cemil Cahit Toydemir Visiting Adolf Hitler July 1943

Turkey was neutral in the war, but signed a treaty with Britain and France in October 1939 that said the Allies would defend Turkey if Germany attacked it. The deal was enhanced with loans of £41 million. An invasion was threatened in 1941 but did not happen and Ankara refused German requests to allow troops to cross its borders into Syria or into the USSR. Germany had been its largest trading partner before the war, and Turkey continued to do business with both sides. It purchased arms from both sides. The Allies tried to stop German purchases of chrome (used in making better steel). Starting in 1942 the Allies provided military aid and pressed for a declaration of war. Turkey's president conferred with Roosevelt and Churchill at the Cairo Conference in November, 1943, and promised to enter the war when it was fully armed. By August 1944, with Germany nearing defeat, Turkey broke off relations. In February 1945, it declared war on Germany and Japan, a symbolic move that allowed Turkey to join the future United Nations. Meanwhile, relations with Moscow worsened, setting stage for the Truman Doctrine of 1947 and the start of the Cold War.

== Governments in exile ==
Britain welcomed governments in exile to set up their headquarters in London whilst others were set up in neutral or other allied territory. Recognition for these bodies would vary and change over time.

=== Poland: in exile and underground ===
"The Mass Extermination of Jews in German Occupied Poland", note of Polish government-in-exile addressed to the wartime allies of the then-United Nations, 1942

When the Polish forces were demolished by Germany in the first three weeks of September 1939, the government vanished and most Polish leaders fled to Romania, where they were interred. Other leaders escaped to France, and later to London, where the Polish government-in-exile was set up by General Sikorski. It was recognized by the Allies until 1944.

The underground resistance movement formed inside Poland; it nominally reported to the government in exile. During the war about 400,000 Poles joined the underground Polish Home Army, about 200,000 went into combat on western fronts in units loyal to the Polish government in exile, and about 300,000 fought under Soviet command in the last stages of the war.

Since the start of the war the body protested on the international stage against the German occupation of their territory and the treatment of their civilian population. In 1940 the Polish Ministry of Information produced a list of those it believed had been murdered by the Nazis. On 10 December 1942, the Polish government-in-exile published a 16-page report addressed to the Allied governments, titled The Mass Extermination of Jews in German Occupied Poland. (Note: See: Polish Ministry of Foreign Affairs (10 December 1942), The Mass Extermination of Jews in German Occupied Poland, note to the governments of the United Nations.) The report contained eight pages of Raczyński's Note, which was sent to foreign ministers of 26 governments who signed the Declaration by United Nations on 1 January 1942.

=== Norway ===
After Germany swept to control in April 1940, the government in exile, including the royal family, was based in London. Politics were suspended and the government coordinated action with the Allies, retained control of a worldwide diplomatic and consular service, and operated the huge Norwegian merchant marine. It organized and supervised the resistance within Norway. One long-term impact was the abandonment of a traditional Scandinavian policy of neutrality; Norway became a founding member of NATO in 1949. Norway at the start of the war had the world's fourth largest merchant fleet, at 4.8 million tons, including a fifth of the world's oil tankers. The Germans captured about 20% of the fleet but the remainder, about 1000 ships, were taken over by the government. Although half the ships were sunk, the earnings paid the expenses of the government.

=== Netherlands ===
The government in 1940 fled to London, where it had command of some colonies as well as the Dutch navy and merchant marine. When they arrived in London the Government in exile considered itself still neutral but found its desire for the liberation of the Netherlands coinciding with the war aims of the Allies. After the fall of France the Dutch Prime Minister Dirk Jan de Geer advocated negotiating a separate peace between the Netherlands and the Third Reich. Queen Wilhelmina, fearing that the loss of the Dutch East Indies to Japan would be a term of any treaty, vetoed any agreement. On 3 September 1940 the Queen dismissed her prime minister and replaced him with Pieter Sjoerds Gerbrandy, who worked with Churchill and Roosevelt on ways to smooth the path for an American entry. Aruba together with Curaçao, the then world-class exporting oil refineries, were the main suppliers of refined products to the Allies. Aruba became a British protectorate from 1940 to 1942 and a US protectorate from 1942 to 1945. On November 23, 1941, under an agreement with the Netherlands government-in-exile, the United States occupied Dutch Guiana to protect the bauxite mines.

=== Czechoslovakia ===
The Czechoslovak government-in-exile was an informal title given to the Czechoslovak National Liberation Committee originally created by the former Czechoslovak President, Edvard Beneš in Paris in October 1939. Unsuccessful negotiations with France for diplomatic status, as well as the impending Nazi occupation of France, forced the Committee to withdraw to London in 1940. The body was eventually considered, by those countries that recognized it, as the legal continuation of the First Republic of Czechoslovakia.

=== Belgium ===
The German invasion lasted only 18 days in 1940 before the Belgian army surrendered. The king remained behind, but the government escaped to France and then to England in 1940. Belgium was liberated in late 1944.

Belgium had two holdings in Africa, the very large colony of the Belgian Congo and the mandate of Ruanda-Urundi. The Belgian Congo was not occupied and remained loyal to the Allies as a useful economic asset. The government in exile sold 3.4 million pounds of uranium ore from the Congo to the US for the atomic bomb. Troops from the Belgian Congo participated in the East African Campaign against the Italians. The colonial Force Publique also served in other theatres alongside British forces.

=== Yugoslavia in exile ===
Yugoslavia had a weak government in exile based in London that included King Peter. However, power inside the country was divided three ways between the Germans and their allies, and two Serbian resistance groups. The royalist anti-communist Chetniks under Draža Mihailović, was nominally under the control of the government in exile. Chetniks were Serbians opposed to the Nazis but sometimes did collaborate with the Germans and Ustaša in their fierce guerrilla battles with the National Liberation Army, a communist-controlled resistance headed by Josip Broz Tito. Tito's strength grew in 1943, and Mihailović and the monarchists fell far behind. Churchill reversed course in December 1943, ended his support for the forces of Mihailović, and backed instead Tito. The government in exile followed suite and supported Tito. Tito drove out the Germans in 1945, repudiated the government in exile, liquidated the Mihailovic forces. This allowed the formation of a communist state of Yugoslavia that was independent of Moscow, with Tito in full control.

=== Korea ===
Based in the Chinese city of Shanghai and later Chongqing the Provisional Government of the Republic of Korea acted as the Korean government-in-exile from 13 April 1919 until the Republic of Korea was established in 1948.

== List of all war declarations and other outbreaks of hostilities ==
Regarding type of war outbreak (fourth column):

- A : Attack without a declaration of war
- U : State of war emerged through ultimatum
- WD : State of war emerged after formal declaration of war
- D : Diplomatic breakdown leading to a state of war. In some cases a diplomatic breakdown later led to a state of war. Such cases are mentioned in the comments.

Date	Attacking Nation(s)	Attacked Nation(s)	Type	Comments
1939-09-01	Germany	Poland	A	
1939-09-03	United Kingdom, France	Germany	U	See British declaration of war on Germany (1939), French declaration of war on Germany (1939)
1939-09-03	Australia, New Zealand	Germany	WD	
1939-09-06	South Africa	Germany	WD	
1939-09-10	Canada	Germany	WD	
1939-09-17	Soviet Union	Poland	A	
1939-11-30	Soviet Union	Finland	A	Diplomatic breakdown day before
1940-04-09	Germany	Denmark, Norway	A	
1940-05-10	Germany	Belgium, Netherlands, Luxembourg	A	The German offensive in western Europe
1940-06-10	Italy	France, United Kingdom	WD	At a time when France already was about to fall
1940-06-10	Canada	Italy	WD	
1940-06-11	South Africa, Australia, New Zealand	Italy	WD	
1940-06-12	Egypt	Italy	D	
1940-07-04	United Kingdom	France*	A	Vichy France Navy and colonies were attacked by UK, but no war was declared
1940-10-28	Italy	Greece	U	
1941-04-06	Germany	Greece	WD	
1941-04-06	Germany, Bulgaria	Yugoslavia	A	
1941-04-06	Italy	Yugoslavia	WD	
1941-04-23	Greece	Bulgaria	D	
1941-06-22	Germany*, Italy, Romania	Soviet Union	WD	*The German declaration of war was given at the time of the attack
1941-06-24	Denmark	Soviet Union	D	Denmark was occupied by Germany
1941-06-25	Finland	Soviet Union	A	Second war between these nations
1941-06-27	Hungary	Soviet Union	D	Diplomatic breakdown 1941-06-24
1941-06-30	France	Soviet Union	D	
1941-12-07	United Kingdom	Romania, Hungary, Finland	U	Diplomatic breakdowns 1941-02-11,1941-04-07 and 1941-08-01
1941-12-07	Japan	Thailand, British Empire, United States	A	WD came the day after
1941-12-08	Japan	United States, British Empire	WD	See Japanese declaration of war on the United States and the British Empire
1941-12-08	United Kingdom	Japan	WD	See United Kingdom declaration of war on Japan
1941-12-08	United States	Japan	WD	See United States declaration of war on Japan
1941-12-08	Canada, the Netherlands, South Africa	Japan	WD	
1941-12-09	China	Germany*, Italy*, Japan	WD	*Diplomatic breakdown 1941-07-02
1941-12-09	Australia, New Zealand	Japan	WD	
1941-12-11	Germany, Italy	United States	WD	See German declaration of war against the United States and Italian declaration of war on the United States
1941-12-11	United States	Germany, Italy	WD	See United States declaration of war upon Germany and United States declaration of war on Italy
1941-12-12	Romania	United States	WD	
1941-12-13	Bulgaria	United Kingdom, United States	WD	
1941-12-15	Hungary	United States	WD	
1942-01-24	United States	Denmark	D	
1942-05-28	Mexico	Germany, Italy, Japan	WD	See Mexican declaration of war on Germany, Italy, and Japan; Diplomatic breakdowns in all three cases 1941
1942-08-22	Brazil	Germany, Italy	WD	Diplomatic breakdowns 1942-01-20 and 1942-01-28
1942-11-09	France	United States	D	
1943-01-20	Chile	Germany, Japan, Italy	D	
1943-09-09	Iran	Germany	WD	Diplomatic breakdown in 1941
1943-10-13	Italy	Germany	WD	After the fall of Mussolini, Italy changed side
1944-01-10	Argentina	Germany, Japan	D	
1944-06-30	United States	Finland	D	
1944-08-04	Turkey	Germany	D	Turkey declared war on Germany on 23 Feb. 1945; a state of war against Germany existed from this date
1944-08-23	Romania	Germany	WD	Like Italy, Romania also changed side.
1944-09-05	Soviet Union	Bulgaria	WD	
1944-09-07	Bulgaria	Germany	D	
1945-02-24	Egypt	Germany*, Japan	WD	*Diplomatic breakdown already 1939
1945	Argentina, Paraguay, Peru, Venezuela, Uruguay, Syria, and Saudi Arabia	Germany	WD	Needed a declaration to be eligible to join United Nations
1945-04-03	Finland	Germany	WD	Diplomatic breakdown in 1944, last outbreak in Europe
1945-07-06	Brazil	Japan	WD	
1945-07-17	Italy	Japan	WD	
1945-08-08	Soviet Union	Japan	WD	Last outbreak of war during the Second World War

Main source: Swedish encyklopedia "Bonniers Lexikon" 15 volumes from the 1960s, article "Andra Världskriget" ("The Second World War"), volume 1 of 15, table in columns 461–462. (Each page are in two columns, numbering of columns only)

== Similar or related works ==
- Allies at War by Tim Bouverie (2025)
- The Storm of War by Andrew Roberts (2009).

== See also ==
- Causes of World War II
- Cold War
- Diplomatic history of World War I
- European foreign policy of the Chamberlain ministry
- Foreign policy of the Franklin D. Roosevelt administration
- Germany–Soviet Union relations, 1918–1941
- International relations (1919–1939)
- Military production during World War II
