= Ogdensburg Agreement =

1940 agreement between Canada and the United States

The Ogdensburg Agreement is an agreement that was concluded between Canadian prime minister William Lyon Mackenzie King and U.S. president Franklin D. Roosevelt in Heuvelton near Ogdensburg, New York, on August 17, 1940. It outlined a permanent plan for mutual defense overseas between the United States and Canada and established the Permanent Joint Board of Defense.

== History and rationale ==
Although Canada and the United States had long been economic partners, Canada had always considered the United Kingdom as its primary military partner. While Canada had been granted independence in its foreign policy from Britain in 1931, Canada's membership in the Commonwealth of Nations, the strength of the British Empire, and the historic and cultural ties between them made a military alliance with the United States seem unnecessary. Most Canadians believed that Britain could provide for all of Canada's defence needs.

Canada had declared war on Nazi Germany shortly after the Second World War began in early September 1939 but the United States remained neutral. By mid-1940, the situation in Europe had grown dire; Germany's military successes had led to the occupation of most of Europe, and most importantly, France, which surrendered in June 1940. With Germany in control or allied with nearly all of continental Europe, it began to develop plans for an invasion of the British Isles. Germany's seemingly unstoppable military, its submarine campaign against British merchant shipping, and its neutrality pact with the Soviet Union, convinced many, including American president Franklin Roosevelt, that Britain itself would soon be invaded or forced to surrender.

By July 1940, Canadian prime minister William Lyon Mackenzie King, along with a growing number of Canadians, was becoming increasingly concerned that Britain would fall and that Canada, with its small population and abundant natural resources, would become Germany's next target. In addition to transferring its gold reserves to Canada at the beginning of the war, the British government had also prepared a contingency plan (which was largely kept secret to avoid hurting morale) to evacuate the royal family, the government and as many critical military and scientific personnel to Canada as possible if the British Isles fell to Germany. These factors only increased concerns that Germany would eventually target Canada for its next conquest.

Both Canada and the United States recognized this threat. Subsequently, it was the United States that initiated preliminary military discussions that became formative in July 1940. On August 18, Roosevelt and King met inland from the border town of Ogdensburg, New York. Roosevelt outlined his plan to create a joint board to oversee the defence of both nations, not just for the duration of the current crisis, but as a permanent body. King immediately agreed, and the Permanent Joint Board on Defence was created.

Most Canadians supported this agreement, which was soon known as the Ogdensburg Agreement, as they deemed it necessary not only for security purposes but also to improve relations with the United States (it was also hoped that the agreement would help pull the United States into the war). However, some Canadians, most notably former Conservative prime minister Arthur Meighen were furious – they argued that by signing this agreement, Canada was not only abandoning Britain but was effectively placing itself under the control of the United States. British Prime Minister Winston Churchill was also angry, stating that "all these transactions will be judged [at the end of the war] in a mood different to that prevailing while the issue still hangs in the balance." King's government recognized these concerns; Canadian negotiators resolutely refused to give the United States control of Canada's forces, and rejected proposals to integrate much of the country's defences into Washington's Northeast and Northwest Defence Commands. King's approach satisfied most Canadians – although co-operation with the United States was essential, it did not mean abandoning Canada's national interests.

== Since World War II ==
The agreement inaugurated closer Canadian-United States military co-operation and established the Permanent Joint Board of Defence, which remains as the senior advisory body on continental security and which is composed of two national sections made up of diplomatic and military representatives. For seven decades its meetings have served as a window on Canada–U.S.A. Defence relations. Canadian–U.S.A. military cooperation was further enhanced by the creation of the North Atlantic Treaty Organization (NATO) in 1949 but the Board continued to serve in an important capacity for bilateral military relations and coordination.

Initially, it was argued that Ogdensburg Agreement involved Canada abandoning Britain in favour of the United States on matters of defence. However, the creation of the NATO in 1949 (which linked Canada and the United States into a collective security agreement with Britain and Western Europe) helped to alleviate these concerns.

The board has examined virtually every important joint defence measure undertaken since the end of World War II, including construction of the Distant Early Warning Line of radars and the creation of the North American Aerospace Defence Command (NORAD) in 1958.

== See also ==
- Military history of Canada
- Military history of the United States

== Bibliography ==
- Creighton, Donald (1976). The Forked Road: Canada, 1939–1957. Toronto: McClelland & Stewart. pp. 38–44, 53–58, 72–74. ISBN 978-0-7710-2360-6. OCLC 2643715.
- Pollock, Fred E. "Roosevelt, the Ogdensburg Agreement, and the British Fleet: All Done with Mirrors." Diplomatic History 5, (Summer 1981): 203–219.
