= Permanent Joint Board on Defense =

Military senior advisory body on continental-scale defence of North America

- Formation: August 17, 1940
- Founded at: Ogdensburg, New York
- Region served: North America
- Members: Canada; United States

The Permanent Joint Board on Defense (French: Commission permanente mixte de défense Canada-États-Unis, spelled Defence in Canadian English) is the senior advisory body on continental military defence of North America. The board was established by Canada and the United States on August 17, 1940 under the Ogdensburg Agreement, signed by President Franklin D. Roosevelt and Prime Minister William Lyon Mackenzie King at Ogdensburg, New York.

== History ==
The joint board is similar to several entities formed earlier by the two countries. In 1909 they formed the International Joint Commission, which by 1940 had successfully resolved issues regarding waters along the Canada–United States border; another was the International Pacific Salmon Fisheries Commission. Such bodies' success likely influenced the design of the Permanent Joint Board on Defense.

On May 18, 2026, the United States Department of Defense announced that it was pausing American participation in the Permanent Joint Board on Defense.

== Composition ==
The board consists of both Canadian and American military and civilian representatives. The main purpose of the group is to provide policy-level consultation on bilateral defence matters. Periodically the board conducts studies and reports to the governments of the United States and Canada. The board, which is co-chaired by a Canadian and an American, meets semi-annually, alternating between either country.

== Work ==
The PJBD has advised on the implementation of several large initiatives such as: The DEW line, NORAD, and construction of the St. Lawrence Seaway.

== See also ==
- Military history of Canada
- Military history of the United States
- Ogdensburg Agreement
- NORAD
- DEW Line
- Five Eyes
- NATO
- Canadian-American relations
- United States Department of Defense
- Department of National Defence (Canada)
