= Advisory Committee on Postwar Foreign Policy =

The Advisory Committee on Postwar Foreign Policy was a secretive committee created on February 12, 1942, to prepare recommendations for President Franklin D. Roosevelt on post World War II foreign policy. Predecessors included the similar Advisory Committee on Problems of Foreign Relations and the Division of Special Research. It was created by Secretary of State Cordell Hull at the suggestion of his assistant Leo Pasvolsky and Norman Davis of the Council on Foreign Relations. The committee appointed subcommittees on political problems, economic reconstruction, territorial matters, legal questions, and international organization, all under the direction of Pasvolsky. After four sessions, the main committee disbanded, Hull preferring to rely on the smaller subcommittees.

Chairman of the committee was Secretary of State Cordell Hull; vice chairman, Under Secretary of State Sumner Welles, Dr. Leo Pasvolsky (director of the Division of Special Research) was appointed Executive Officer. The committee included Dean Acheson, Esther C. Brunauer, Lauchlin Currie, Laurence Duggan, Herbert Feis, Alger Hiss, Harry Hawkins, Philip Jessup, Archibald MacLeish, Charles W. Yost, George C. Marshall, Henry Wadleigh, Henry Agard Wallace, and Harry Dexter White.

Several experts were brought in from outside the State Department, mostly members of the Council on Foreign Relations such as Hamilton Fish Armstrong, Isaiah Bowman, Benjamin V. Cohen, Norman H. Davis, Anne O'Hare McCormick, James T. Shotwell and Myron Taylor. The international organizations subcommittee, the Special Subcommittee on International Organization, included Welles, Bowman, Pasvolsky, Cohen, Shotwell, Notter, Green Hackworth (the State Department legal adviser) and later Clark Eichelberger of the League of Nations Association, and eventually produced a draft charter of a new international organization. The economic policy subcommittee was led by Dean Acheson, and the economic reconstruction subcommittee by Adolph Berle.

From March 1942, the committee was supplied with research secretaries by the Council on Foreign Relations' War and Peace Studies project, with each subcommittee being served by the secretary of a corresponding Council study group. Meetings were scheduled to allow secretaries to carry out Council work during the first half of each week with the remainder of the week spent at the State Department.

In early 1943, as the main committee declined in importance, much of its work was taken over by the Informal Political Agenda Group composed of Hull, Welles, Taylor, Davis, Bowman and Pasvolsky.
