= Leo Pasvolsky =

American journalist

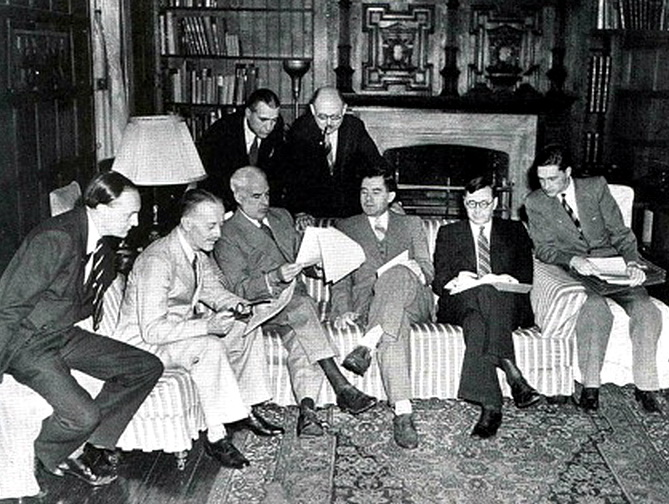
Leo Pasvolsky (standing right) at the Dumbarton Oaks Conference, August 1944

Leo Pasvolsky (August 22, 1893 – May 5, 1953) was a journalist, economist, state department official and special assistant to Secretary of State Cordell Hull. He was one of the United States government's main planners for the post World War II world and "probably the foremost author of the UN Charter." Thomas Connally said in his memoirs "Certainly he had more to do with writing the framework of the charter than anyone else." His New York Times obituary is subtitled "Wrote Charter of World Organization." A short, rotund, mustachioed pipe smoker with a very large and round head, he joked that he might find it easier to roll than to walk. An aide compared him to the third little pig in the Three Little Pigs, Hull called him "Friar Tuck". A hardworking "one-man think tank" for Hull, he preferred to stay invisible, in the background. In the words of Richard Holbrooke, he "was one of those figures peculiar to Washington – a tenacious bureaucrat who, fixed on a single goal, left behind a huge legacy while virtually disappearing from history."

== Early life ==
Pasvolsky was born in a Jewish family in Pavlograd in the Russian Empire in 1893. His parents were anti-czarists and the family fled to the United States in 1905. After graduating from the City College of New York in 1916 he studied political science at Columbia University and also attended the University of Geneva. He then edited periodicals, the monthly The Russian Review and Amerikansky Viestnik, and the daily newspaper Russkoye Slovo. Engaged in the tempestuous political climate of the emigres in New York, he debated Leon Trotsky during his visit to New York in 1916. He was at first optimistic about the Russian Revolution, and worked as the secretary of Boris Bakhmeteff, the last Ambassador to the US of the Kerensky government, but became embittered and anti-communist after Lenin's October Revolution.

In 1919 he covered the Paris Peace Conference for the New York Tribune, the Brooklyn Eagle and other newspapers, and in 1921 he covered the Washington Arms Conference for the Baltimore Sun. During this period he became a Wilsonian internationalist and softened his stance toward the Soviet Union, arguing for its recognition by the US and its admission into the League of Nations.

== Brookings ==
In 1922 he became an economist on the staff of the Brookings Institution, from which he received a Ph.D. in 1936, and which was his institutional base until his death in 1953. In November 1926, he married Clara Christine McCormick of Pittsburgh.

In his writings in the 1920s, he argued that the Soviet Union's 1918–1921 war communism was an ideologically based attempt to realize Marx's vision of socialism or communism, rather than a short-term wartime expedient with no lasting significance. He also wrote critically about Proletkult, principally citing The Cultural Aims of the Working Class (Russian: Культурные задачи рабочего класса. Культура общечеловеческая и классовая) text originally published by Anatoly Lunacharsky in 1917 by Novaya Zhizn. Pasvolsky claimed the texts gathered into a pamphlet were required reading for every member of Proletkult. He then gives an account that developed that its chief characteristic was pretentious artificiality. With the foundation of Kultintern he claimed this would reduce the Proletkult movement "not primarily, but exclusively" to a weapon to promote the Bolshevik view of communism. Pasvolsky's book on Bulgaria and others from this period are still regarded as useful surveys by specialists.

== Bureaucrat ==
Early in the first Roosevelt administration, he was hired by Cordell Hull as his personal assistant but returned to Brookings after two years. Later, he worked in the Bureau of Foreign and Domestic Commerce of the Department of Commerce (1934–35) and in the Division of Trade Agreements 1935–36 and later in various capacities in the State Department from 1935 to 1946. During the 1930s and 1940s, frequently with Harold G. Moulton, his closest ally and collaborator since the 1920s at Brookings, he envisioned a stable, open world economy based on international political cooperation involving a successor to the League of Nations, wider than an alliance of democracies, and with international police powers. Earlier Brookings studies of the 1920s and 1930s focused on the importance of worldwide demand to the American economy, but by 1941 Paslovsky and Moulton underscored the ever-growing dependence of the American economy on foreign raw materials binding the US more tightly to the world economy. "Even before America entered the war, Pasvolsky was thinking about the postwar world." He joined the Council on Foreign Relations in 1938. Along with Norman Davis, Pasvolsky, nicknamed "Pazzy" by some council members, became the main liaison between the Council and the State Department, and regularly attended the council's Economic and Financial Group meetings in New York.

As Hull's assistant, he was on the same level as the six assistant secretaries of state.

In September 1939, Hull assigned Pasvolsky to planning for the postwar peace, and at Pasvolsky's suggestion, set up the Advisory Committee on Problems of Foreign Relations. After this became moribund, Hull appointed Pasvolsky the first director of the State Department's new Division of Special Research in February 1941. During 1942 diplomat Charles W. Yost served as Assistant Chief. The two would work together at the Dumbarton Oaks conference, drafting the UN Charter. When the division was split in January 1943 into a Division of Political Studies and a Division of Economic Studies, Pasvolsky continued to supervise them. He was executive officer of the secretive Advisory Committee on Postwar Foreign Policy, which superseded the Division, returning to the broadly based Advisory Committee concept.

=== UN planning ===
The work of the Advisory Committee led to the drafting of an outline for a "preliminary UN" by Undersecretary Sumner Welles, based on the design of the League of Nations. Pasvolsky and Hull eventually opposed Welles' draft as being too hastily written. The major split was over whether the organization would have a "regional" nature, perhaps with local councils, in which each great power would have most of the responsibility for its region, or would have more centralized structure. Welles, as well as Winston Churchill (and later, Nelson Rockefeller) favored "regionalism," while Pasvolsky and Hull favored a unitary global body. Roosevelt wavered between the two sides.

Throughout 1942, Welles took the lead on planning for the UN and in January 1943 discussed a new and full draft charter with Roosevelt. It incorporated Roosevelt's four power "global policemen" but gave them less than absolute veto powers on an Executive Council with "regional" members too. Welles continued to work on the draft, but after a period of political infighting with Hull, he was forced to resign in August 1943. Subsequently, Hull took charge of UN planning, and appointed Pasvolsky to put together a draft charter, which he produced in August. It retained the Security Council, General Assembly and Secretariat, which Welles and Pasvolsky had agreed on, but downplayed regionalism. With the absence of Welles or any other figure with comparable influence, interest and expertise Pasvolsky's ideas and phrasing dominated the drafting henceforward. Before Hull departed for the Moscow Conference (1943), Pasvolsky advised him that economic reconstruction, especially in the USSR, should be a prioritized, while Isaiah Bowman insisted on territorial agreements restricting Soviet expansion. By February 3, 1944, Roosevelt had approved Pasvolsky's latest draft. It incorporated two major departures "that modulated at least the naked appearance of Big Four dominance". Unlike the League of Nations, it entrusted security matters exclusively to the Security Council. However, it widened the Security Council into an 11-member entity, reducing the dominance of the four big powers that Roosevelt had long envisioned.

In 1943 Pasvolsky was placed in charge of International Organization and Security Affairs in the State Department with responsibility for drafting the United Nations Charter; he was present at Bretton Woods and Dumbarton Oaks. He became chairman of the Coordination Committee at the San Francisco United Nations Conference on International Organization, where the charter was negotiated and signed. Secretary Hull depended heavily on Pasvolsky to explain the plans and proposals for the UN to President Roosevelt. Craufurd Goodwin writes "It is striking how close a resemblance Pasvolsky's statement of objectives for the new international organization bears to the positions he had taken with Moulton throughout the previous decade."

Another important innovation at Dumbarton Oaks was the Economic and Social Council. Pasvolsky and the new Secretary of State Edward Stettinius Jr. managed to persuade Roosevelt to drop his idea of adding Brazil as a sixth member of the Security Council. Pasvolsky opposed an absolute veto by permanent members on all Security Council discussions and resolutions as giving these big states too much power, while Hull and the Soviets supported it. His persistence on this issue persuaded Hull and eventually the Soviets to limit the veto to substantive matters only – not allowing it on procedural ones including discussions.

=== Other postwar planning ===
The British Foreign Research and Press Service, directed by Arnold J. Toynbee, also worked on plans for postwar reconstruction and political and economic arrangements and collaborated closely with the Advisory Committee. Toynbee and Pasvolsky "met on many occasions to discuss in detail ideas about the shape of a world order under Anglo-Saxon leadership."

Pasvolsky, reflecting the thought of the State Department, the British, led by Lord Keynes and even the Soviets, envisioned the "eventual integration of Germany into the world economy." This lenience towards Germany in a 1944 State department memorandum by Pasvolsky inspired Treasury Secretary Morgenthau's opposed Morgenthau plan, but while the Morgenthau plan won tentative approval, the more lenient policies were eventually carried out. Similarly, Pasvolsky, concerned about the strain on occupation forces, favored not insisting on the removal of the Japanese emperor, opposing Dean Acheson and Archibald MacLeish

== Return to Brookings and death ==
He resigned from the State Department in March 1946. In 1946–53 he was director of international studies at the Brookings Institution, and at the time of his death, he was working on a study of the origin and history of the United Nations. He died of a heart attack on May 5, 1953, in Washington, DC, survived by his wife Christine McCormick Pasvolsky, two sisters (Elaine Elnett and Clara Pasvolsky) and two brothers (Valentine and Elias). His incomplete manuscript on the history of the UN was the basis of his assistant Ruth Russell's 1961 History of the United Nations Charter, the standard work on the subject.

== Critics ==
Pasvolsky had his share of enemies at the State Department. Isaiah Bowman, one of the leading advisers of the State Department, took an instant dislike to Pasvolsky. Bowman, Welles and Pasvolsky engaged in a power struggle over the direction of the Advisory Committee in late 1942. Bowman's differences with Pasvolsky erupted at San Francisco, where he wrote that he was "dangerous to American interests" and that it was "a mistake to put one man with his background into a key position." Pasvolsky resented Bowman equally, and wrote him out of subsequent histories of the UN's founding.

I F Stone called Pasvolsky "Kerensky's gift to American foreign policy and political science" and considered that the widely used Brookings publications on US foreign policy prepared under his direction reflected "an ultra-right point of view".

Some considered Pasvolsky's Brookings ideas for the world's economic problems simple-minded. Dean Acheson referred disparagingly to the "Hull-Pasvolsky establishment" and wrote that "Leo Pasvolsky was Mr. Hull's principal speech writer. Or one might say, he wrote Mr. Hull's principal speech: for whatever the occasion or title, the speech was apt to turn into a dissertation on the benefits of unhampered international trade and the true road to it through agreements reducing tariffs." Acheson belittled Pasvolsky's postwar planning:

The whole effort, except for two results, seems to have been a singularly sterile one, uninspired by gifts either of insight or prophecy. One of these results was the foundation work for the United Nations Charter, the other, which laid an even broader foundation, the education of Senator Arthur Vandenberg to understand that beyond the borders of the United States existed a "vast external realm" which could and would affect profoundly our interests and our destiny.

In a 1967 letter, Acheson criticized American moralism in international affairs, which he saw as culminating in "that little rat Leo Pasvolsky's United Nations."

== Works ==
- The Economics of Communism: With Special Reference to Russia's Experiment (pdf), New York: Macmillan, 1921
- Russia in the Far East (pdf). New York: Macmillan. 1922. ISBN 0-8305-0087-1.
- Economic Nationalism of the Danubian States, New York: Macmillan, 1928
- Bulgaria's Economic Position: With Special Reference to the Reparation Problem and the Work of the League of Nations, Washington, DC: The Brookings Institution, 1930
- Current Monetary Issues, Washington, DC: The Brookings Institution, 1933
- Moulton, Harold G.; Pasvolsky, Leo (1924), Russian Debts and Russian Reconstruction: A Study of the Relation of Russia's Foreign Debts to Her Economic Recovery, Washington, DC: The Brookings Institution, McGraw-Hill, archived from the original on October 13, 2012 – via Questia
- Moulton, Harold G.; Pasvolsky, Leo (1926), World War Debt Settlements, New York: The Macmillan Company, archived from the original on 2013-12-09 – via Questia
- Moulton, Harold G.; Pasvolsky, Leo (1932), War Debts and World Prosperity, Washington, DC: The Brookings Institution, archived from the original on 2011-06-05 – via Questia
