= List of Baldwin School alumnae =

This list of alumnae of the Baldwin School includes graduates and non-graduate former students.

- Bertha Adkins (1924) – undersecretary of Health, Education, and Welfare; chairman of the Federal Council on Aging; organizer of the White House Council on Children and Youth; Maryland Women's Hall of Fame inductee; executive director of the Women's Division of the Republican National Committee
- Katayoun Copeland (1985) – assistant U.S. attorney and district attorney of Delaware County, Pennsylvania
- Ruth Davidon (1982) – rower, 1996 Summer Olympics and 2000 Summer Olympics
- Louise Dolan (1967) – mathematical physicist and professor of Physics, University of North Carolina at Chapel Hill, Fulbright Scholar, Harvard University Junior Fellow, Guggenheim Fellow, Maria Goeppert-Mayer Award of the American Physical Society
- Gertrude Sumner Ely (1895) – twice-decorated by the French for distinguished bravery under fire, past president of the Pennsylvania League of Women Voters, member of the executive committee for UNICEF and the World Affairs Councils of America
- Henrietta H. Fore (1966) – first female administrator of the United States Agency for International Development (USAID) and director of U.S. Foreign Assistance, 37th director of the United States Mint in the U.S. Department of Treasury, presidential appointee for President George H. W. Bush at the U.S. Agency for International Development
- Jody Gerson (1979) – chairman and CEO of Universal Music Publishing Group, co-president of Sony/ATV Music Publishing, responsible for signing Lady Gaga, Alicia Keys and Norah Jones, producer of Drumline and ATL, executive producer of Drumline: A New Beat
- Alice Goffman – sociologist
- Farah J. Griffin (1981) – author, professor at Columbia University, New York Public Library Cullman Center for Scholars and Writers fellow
- Trish Hall (1968) – The New York Times Op-Ed and Sunday Review editor
- Andrea Lee (1970) – writer and novelist
- Leslie Lyness (1986) – US women's field hockey midfielder, 1996 Summer Olympics
- Helen Taft Manning (1908) – daughter of President William Howard Taft, dean of Bryn Mawr College, Distinguished Daughter of Pennsylvania, suffragette
- Martha Nussbaum (1964) – author, first female junior fellow at Harvard University, Ernst Freund Distinguished Service Professor of Law and Ethics at the University of Chicago, founding president of the Human Development and Capability Association, past president of American Philosophical Association, Central Division
- Margaret Robinson (1969) – professor of Molecular Cell Biology at Cambridge Institute for Medical Research at University of Cambridge, Fellow of the Royal Society
- Ishana Night Shyamalan (2017) – filmmaker, producer, and writer; daughter of M. Night Shyamalan
- Cornelia Otis Skinner (1918) – author of Our Hearts Were Young and Gay, film and Broadway actress
- Asali Solomon – author and academic
- Katrina Ely Tiffany (1893) – suffragist in New York City
- Anne Cabot Wyman (1948–2014) – journalist, first female editorial page editor of The Boston Globe, Pulitzer Prize for Public Service, Pulitzer Prize for Editorial Writing finalist
- Marjorie Yang (1970) – non-official member of the Executive Council of Hong Kong, chairperson of the Esquel Group, independent non-executive director of HSBC, Swire Pacific and Novartis AG, Fortune Magazine's Top 50 Most Powerful Women in International Business
- Kinney Zalesne (1983) – general manager of Corporate Strategy at Microsoft, counsel to U.S. Attorney General Janet Reno, White House Fellow, assistant district attorney for the City of Philadelphia
