= Commission to Study the Organization of Peace =

Pro-UN formation organization

Commission to Study the Organization of Peace (CSOP)
- Formation: 1939
- Dissolved: 1973 or later
- Purpose: Promote world peace
- Headquarters: 8 West Fortieth Street, New York City
- Location: New York City
- Fields: Peace
- James T. Shotwell: Chairman
- William Allan Nielson: Executive Chairman
- Clyde Eagleton: Vice-Chairman
- Clark Eichelberger: Executive Director
- Board of directors: Malcolm W. Davis, Lucius R. Eastman, Benjamin Gerig, Roger S. Greene, Emily Hickman, Pauline Mandigo, Quincy Wright
- Secessions: Committee for the Marshall Plan

The Commission to Study the Organization of Peace (CSOP), was an organization established during World War II to promote the formation of a United Nations as successor to the failed League of Nations.

== History ==
In 1939, Professor James T. Shotwell of Columbia University, Professor Clyde Eagleton of New York University, Quincy Wright of the University of Chicago, and League of Nations Association director Clark Eichelberger co-founded the Commission to Study the Organization of Peace. Supporters included U.S. President Franklin Delano Roosevelt, U.S. Secretary of State Cordell Hull, and Undersecretary of State Sumner Welles.

On December 30, 1942 letter to New York State Governor Herbert H. Lehman, executive director Clark Eichelberger described progress to date made by the commission: a First Report (November 1940) regarding fundamentals of lasting (world) peace, a Second Report (undated) regarding problems in reconstruction after World War II, and a Third Report (due out in 1943) regarding the formation of the United Nations "to carry out the principles of the Atlantic Charter."

In November 1943 (some time after November 5, 1943), the CSOP published a 27-page Fourth Report on the "Fundamentals of the International Organization." In it, the commission stated its determination to form a United Nations organization differently from the method to devise the earlier (unsuccessful) League of Nations. The method followed to form the League of Nation was to "draft a constitution in broad, firm outlines and leave it to the future to fill in the details." The CSOP advocated an alternative method to form a succeeding United Nations, "to begin with the details and work out through them to a completed whole."

=== Members ===
In 1942, CSOP members included:

- James T. Shotwell, Chairman
- Margaret Olson, Secretary
- Clark Eichelberger, Executive Director
- Executive Committee:
  - William Allan Nielson, Executive Chairman
  - Clyde Eagleton, Vice-Chairman
  - Members: Malcolm W. Davis, Lucius R. Eastman, Benjamin Gerig, Roger S. Greene, Emily Hickman, Pauline Mandigo, Quincy Wright
- Studies Committee:
  - Clyde Eagleton, Chairman
  - Members: Malcolm W. Davis, Benjamin Gerig, Harry Gideonse, Carter Goodrich, Willam P. Maddox, Walter Sharp, Quincy Wright

In 1943, members included: James T. Shotwell (Chairman), Allen D. Albert, Mary Noel Arrowsmith, Henry A. Arkinson, Ruhl J. Bartlett, Clarence A. Berdahl, Arthur E. Bestor, Frank G. Boudreau MD, Phillips Bradley, Esther Caukin Brunauer, James B. Carey, Ben M. Cherrington, John L. Childs, E. J. Coil, Kenneth Colegrove, J. B. Condliffe, Edward A. Conway, Merle Curd, Marion Cuthbert, Mrs. Harvey N. Davis, Malcohn W. Davis, Monroe E. Deutsch, Marshall E. Dimock, Ursula Hubbard Duffus, Clark M. Eichelberger, William Emerson, Philo T. Farnsworth, Edgar J. Fisher, Denna F. Fleming, Margaret E. Forsyth, Harry D. Gideonse, Virginia C. Gildersleeve, Arthur J. Goldsmith, Carter Goodrich, Roger S. Greene, Pennington Haile, J. Eugene Harley, Henry I. Harriman, Walter D. Head, Amy Hewes, Emily Hickman, Melvin D. Hildreth, Edward H. Hume, MD, Erling M. Hunt, Samuel Guy Inman, Oscar I. Janowsky, Alvin Johnson, Anne Hartwell Johnstone, B. H. Kizer, John I. Knudson, Hans Kohn, Walter M. Kotschnig, Walter H. C. Laves, Katherine Lenroot, Beryl H. Levy, Frank Lorimer, Pauline E. Mandigo, Charles E. Martin, F. Dean McClusky, Francis E. McMahon, Frederick C. McKee, William P. Merrill, Hugh Moore, George W. Morgan, Laura Puffer Morgan, S. D. Myres Jr, Philip C. Nash, William Allan Neilson, G. Bernard Noble, Ernest Minor Patterson, James G. Patton, Ralph Barton Perry, James P. Pope, Richard J. Purcell, C. Eden Quainton, Harry B. Reynolds, Leland Rex Robinson, Chester H. Rowell, John A. Ryan, Sanford Schwarz, Hans Simons, Preston Slosson, Eugene Staley, Waldo E. Stephens, Arthur Sweetser, Elbert D. Thomas, Channing H. Tobias, Sarah Wambaugh, Edith E. Ware, Robert J. Watt, W. W. Waymack, Ernest H. Wilkins, C.-E. A. Winslow MD, Richard R. Wood, Quincy Wright, James Fulton Zimmerman

In 1962, executive committee members included: James T. Shotwell (honorary chairman), Arthur N. Holcombe (chairman), Clarence A. Berdahl, Inis L. Claude Jr., Benjamin V. Cohen, Oscar A. de Lima, Clark M. Eichelberger, Leland M. Goodrich, Charles C. Price, James R. Warburg, Richard R. Wood, Quincy Wood.

The committee continued its existence into the 1950s (when its address was 41 East 65th Street, New York City), the 1960s (when its address was 345 East 46th Street, New York City), and as late as 1970 and 1973, when it was still publishing reports

== Legacy ==
Clark Eichelberger and Herbert H. Lehman were both later members of the Committee for the Marshall Plan (1947–1948).

== See also ==
- United Nations
- Committee for the Marshall Plan
- James T. Shotwell
- Clark Eichelberger

== External sources ==
- United Nations Television: General Debate (Cont'd) - 30th Meeting, 33rd Regular Session Human Rights Council (September 26, 2016)
- GuideStar: Commission to Study the Organization of Peace
- "various publications of CSOP". University of Pennsylvania.
