= Mary Noel Arrowsmith =

American educator (1890–1965)

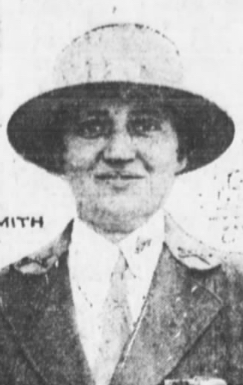
- Mary Noel Arrowsmith, from a 1919 publication.
- Born: May 28, 1890
- Died: October 7, 1965 (aged 75)
- Occupation: Educator
- Awards: Croix de Guerre

Mary Noel Arrowsmith (May 28, 1890 – October 7, 1965) was an American educator who was awarded a Croix de Guerre for her work with YMCA in France during World War I. Later she was active in promoting safety education and in the peace movement. She also served on the national staff of the YWCA.

== Early life ==
Mary Noel Arrowsmith was born May 28, 1890, in Connecticut, the daughter of Harold Arrowsmith and Helen Fleming Smith Arrowsmith. Her father was an Episcopal clergyman. She graduated from Smith College in 1913. At Smith, she wrote about Hinduism, and wrote poetry, for the college magazine.

== World War I ==
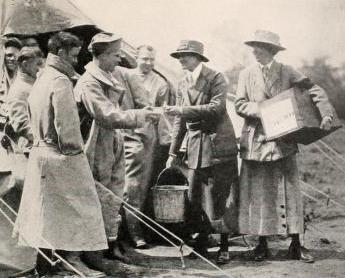
Mary Noel Arrowsmith (holding basket) and Gertrude Sumner Ely (holding box), at a field hospital in France, 1918.

During World War I, Arrowsmith worked with YMCA in France in 1918, running a canteen near the front, alongside Gertrude Sumner Ely of Philadelphia. She was awarded the Croix de Guerre for her "great spirit of duty and ability when in danger." She shared a place of honor in a 1919 parade in New York, with fellow YMCA war workers Ely, Frances Gulick, Ethel Creighton Torrance, and Marjorie Skelding.

== Career ==
=== Education ===
After the war, Arrowsmith was an education specialist, who published several articles in the Teachers College Record and other professional journals in the 1920s. She was assistant secretary of the education section of the National Safety Council in 1923 and 1924, which involved visiting local school districts to consult on safety education curricula. "Safety education does three things," she explained: "First it makes the child alive to the dangers with which complex modern life surrounds him and skilful in combating them. Second, it helps to form safety habits which will protect him throughout his life. Third, it awakes in the child a sense of the value and preciousness of human life and his responsibility in keeping himself sound and whole, and in making his home, his school, and his community a safe place to live in."

=== YWCA, peace, and human rights ===
Arrowsmith served on the national standards study commission of the YWCA in 1940. She was secretary for international education on the YWCA's national staff during World War II.

In 1928, Arrowsmith wrote an article for The Nation titled "Irredentism in Hungary." She was a member of the Commission to Study the Organization of Peace, headed by James T. Shotwell, and signed the commission's 1944 statement titled "International Safeguard of Human Rights." She wrote "Are the United Nations Moving Toward a Governed World?", a leaflet published by the National Peace Conference.
