= Charles Yost =

American diplomat (1907–1981)

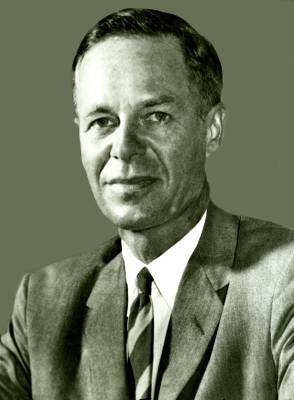

United States Ambassador to the United Nations
- In office January 23, 1969 – February 25, 1971
- President: Richard Nixon
- Preceded by: James Russell Wiggins
- Succeeded by: George H. W. Bush

United States Ambassador to Morocco
- In office August 6, 1958 – March 5, 1961
- President: Dwight D. Eisenhower
- Preceded by: Cavendish W. Cannon
- Succeeded by: Philip Bonsal

United States Ambassador to Syria
- In office January 16, 1958 – February 22, 1958
- President: Dwight D. Eisenhower
- Preceded by: James S. Moose Jr.
- Succeeded by: Raymond A. Hare (United Arab Republic)

United States Ambassador to Laos
- In office November 1, 1954 – April 27, 1956
- President: Dwight D. Eisenhower
- Preceded by: Donald R. Heath
- Succeeded by: J. Graham Parsons

United States Ambassador to Thailand
- Acting
- In office January 5, 1946 – July 4, 1946
- President: Harry S. Truman
- Preceded by: Willys R. Peck
- Succeeded by: Edwin F. Stanton

Personal details
- Born: Charles Woodruff Yost; November 6, 1907 Watertown, New York, U.S.
- Died: May 21, 1981 (aged 73) Washington, D.C., U.S.
- Party: Democratic
- Education: Princeton University (BA); École pratique des hautes études (attended)

Charles Woodruff Yost (November 6, 1907 – May 21, 1981) was a career U.S. Ambassador. Following postings in Europe, Asia, Africa and the Middle East, he was assigned as his country's representative to the United Nations from 1969 to 1971.

== Early life and education ==
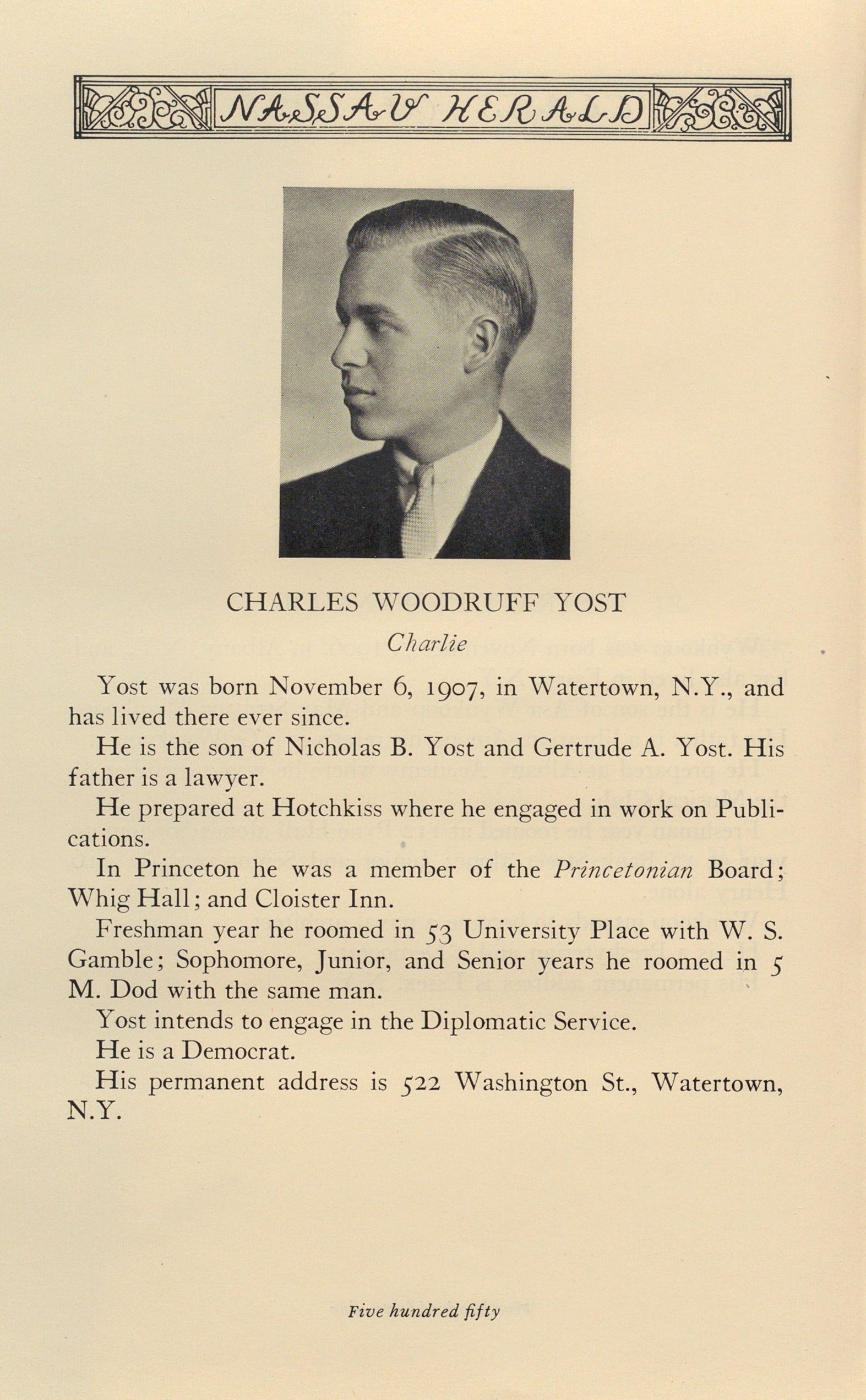
Yost in the Princeton University yearbook, 1928

Yost was born in Watertown, New York. He attended the Hotchkiss School, where he was a member of the class of 1924 that included Roswell Gilpatric, Paul Nitze and H. Chapman Rose, before graduating from Princeton University in 1928. He did postgraduate studies at the École des Hautes Études International (École pratique des hautes études) in Paris. Over the next year he traveled to Geneva, Berlin, the Soviet Union (with author Croswell Bowen), Poland, Rumania, Hungary, Yugoslavia, Spain, and Vienna.

== Career ==
Yost joined the U.S. Foreign Service in 1930 on the advice of former Secretary of State Robert Lansing, and served in Alexandria, Egypt as Vice Consul, followed by an assignment in Poland. In 1933, he left the Foreign Service to pursue a career as a freelance foreign correspondent in Europe and a writer in New York City.

After his marriage to Irena Rawicz-Oldakowska, he returned to the U.S. State Department where he wrote articles for Common Sense, gave speeches on Nazism for Norma Thomas. In 1935, he went to work for the Works Progress Administration before becoming assistant chief of the Division of Arms and Munitions Control in 1936. In 1941, he represented the State Department on the Policy Committee of the Board of Economic Warfare. Yost was appointed assistant chief of special research in 1942 and was made assistant chief of the Division of Foreign Activity Correlation in 1943. In February of the next year, he became executive secretary of the Department of State Policy Committee. He attended the Dumbarton Oaks Conference from August to October 1944, when he worked on Chapters VI and VII of the United Nations Charter. He then served at the United Nations Conference on International Organization in San Francisco in April 1945 as aide to Secretary of State Edward Stettinius. In July of that year, he was secretary-general of the US delegation to the Potsdam Conference.

In 1945, Yost was reinstated in the Foreign Service, and later that year he served as political adviser to U.S. Lieutenant General Raymond Albert Wheeler on the staff of Lord Louis Mountbatten in Kandy, Ceylon. He then became chargé d'affaires in Thailand during the short reign of Ananda Mahidol. Throughout the late 1940s and the 1950s, his assignments took him to Czechoslovakia, Austria (twice), and Greece. In 1954, he was named minister to Laos, and he became the first United States ambassador there a year later. In 1957, he was minister counselor in Paris. At the end of the same year he was named ambassador to Syria. Shortly after his appointment, Syria and Egypt formed the United Arab Republic, and the U.S. was asked to close its embassy in Syria. Yost was then sent as ambassador to Morocco in 1958.

In 1961, he began his first assignment at the United Nations as the deputy to Ambassador Adlai Stevenson. After Stevenson's death in 1965, Yost stayed on as deputy to Ambassador Arthur Goldberg. In 1964, Yost was promoted to the rank of Career Ambassador, the highest professional Foreign Service level, in recognition of especially distinguished service over a sustained period.

In 1966 he resigned from the Foreign Service to begin his career as a writer, at the Council on Foreign Relations, and as a teacher, at Columbia University.

In 1969, President Richard Nixon called Yost out of retirement to become the permanent United States representative to the United Nations. He resigned in 1971 and returned to writing, at the Brookings Institution, and teaching at Georgetown University's School of Foreign Service.

Yost set forth his views in a syndicated newspaper column, for The Christian Science Monitor, and in four books — The Age of Triumph and Frustration: Modern Dialogues, The Insecurity of Nations, The Conduct and Misconduct of Foreign Relations, and History and Memory. He also wrote regular articles for The New York Times and the Washington Post.

In 1974, Yost was awarded the Foreign Service Cup by his fellow Foreign Service officers.

In 1979, Yost was co-chairman of Americans for SALT II, a group that lobbied the Senate for passage of the second Strategic Arms Limitation Treaty. He was a trustee of the American University in Cairo, Egypt, and director of the Aspen Institute for cultural exchanges with Iran. He took part in the unofficial Dartmouth Conferences of United States and Soviet scholars. In 1973, he was named head of the National Committee on United States-China Relations; he visited the People's Republic of China in 1973 and 1977.

== Death ==
Yost died of cancer on May 21, 1981, at Georgetown University Hospital in Washington, D.C., at age 73.

== Legacy ==
Yost's papers are held at Princeton University Library's Special Collections Department.

== Family ==
Yost's ancestors, who were driven out of the German Palatinate by Louis XIV's armies in the late 17th century, settled in the valley of the Mohawk River in New York State. Others were of Scotch-Irish origin and came to America with the immigration that took place around the mid-18th century.

Yost's ancestor Edward Howell founded Watermill on Long Island, New York, and his ancestor Abraham Cooper founded Oxbow, New York. His ancestor Brigadier General Nicholas Herkimer was a hero of the American Revolutionary War.

Yost's father, Nicholas, an attorney, judge, and bank president was married to Yost's mother, Gertrude, by Pastor Dulles, the father of Secretary of State John Foster Dulles.

In 1934, Yost married Irena Rawicz-Oldakowska in Poland. Her father was Kazimierz Ołdakowski, the pre-war director of Fabryka Broni. They had two sons, Nicholas and Casimir, and a daughter, Felicity.

== Career timeline ==
- 1931: Vice Consul Alexandria, Egypt
- 1932: Vice Consul Warsaw, Poland
- 1933: Resigned from the Foreign Service and became a journalist
- 1935:
  - 1) Progress Report Specialist at the Resettlement Administration
  - 2) Divisional Assistant, U.S. Department of State, Division of Western European Affairs
  - 3) Assistant Chief, U.S. Department of State, Office of Arms and Munitions Control
- 1936: Division of Arms and Munitions Control
- 1939: Assistant Chief, U.S. Department of State, Division of Controls
- 1941:
  - 1) Assistant Chief, U.S. Department of State, Division of Exports and Defense Aid
  - 2) Assistant to the U.S. High Commissioner to the Commonwealth of the Philippines
- 1941-42: Designated to act in Liaison between Division of European Affairs of State Department and British Empire Division of the Board of Economic Warfare
- 1942:
  - 1) Assistant Chief, U.S. Department of State, Division of European Affairs, Office of Foreign Territories, Security Committee
  - 2) Member of the Inter-Divisional Country and Area Committees of the Advisory Committee on Problems of Foreign Relations
  - 3) Assistant Chief, U.S. Department of State, Division of Special Research
- 1943:
  - 1) Division of European Affairs
  - 2) Office of Foreign Economic Coordination, U.S. Department of State
- 1943-44: Assistant Chief, U.S. Department of State, Division of Foreign Activity Correlation
- 1944:
  - 1) Executive Secretary, Department of State Policy Committee
  - 2) Division of International Security and Organization
  - 3) Executive Secretary, U.S. Department of State, Joint Secretariat of the Executive Staff Committee
  - 4) Assistant to the chairman for the Dumbarton Oaks Conference
- 1945:
  - 1) Special Assistant to the chairman, Secretary of State Stettinius, U.S. Delegation to the United Nations Conference on International Organizations, San Francisco
  - 2) Secretary-General, U.S. Delegation, Berlin Conference, Potsdam Agreement
  - 3) Assigned as U.S. Political Adviser to General Wheeler, Deputy Supreme Allied Commander to the Southeast Asia Command (SEAC), India & Ceylon
  - 4) Assigned as U.S. Political Adviser to General Thomas Terry, Commander of the American India-Burma Theater
- 1946:
  - 1) Chargé d'affaires, Bangkok, Thailand
  - 2) U.S. Delegation to UNESCO, United Nations, Lake Success, New York
  - 3) Political Adviser to U.S. Delegation, General Assembly of the United Nations
- 1947: First Secretary & Counselor, Prague, Czechoslovakia
- 1947-49: Deputy High Commissioner, and First Secretary & Counselor of Legation, Vienna, Austria
- 1949:
  - 1) Member of U.S. Delegation; Special Assistant to Ambassador at Large for Sixth Session of the Council of Foreign Ministers Meeting, Paris, France
  - 2) Member of Delegation to Fourth Regular Session of the General Assembly of the United Nations as Special Assistant to Ambassador at Large
  - 3) Director of the Office of Eastern European Affairs, Department of State
- 1950:
  - 1) Director of the Office of Eastern European Affairs, Department of State
  - 2) Special Assistant to Ambassador at Large, Deputy Policy Adviser to the U.S. Delegation to the United Nations, New York
  - 3) European Affairs Rep., U.S. Department of State, on Policy Comm. on Immigration and Naturalization
  - 4) U.S. Department of State, Policy Planning Staff
- 1950-53: Counselor with Personal rank of Minister, Athens, Greece
- 1953: Deputy High Commissioner & Deputy Chief of Mission, Vienna, Austria
- 1954: Minister, Vientiane, Laos
- 1955-1956: Ambassador, Laos
- 1956-57: Minister, Paris, France
- 1957-58: Ambassador, Damascus, Syria
- 1958: Foreign Affairs Specialist, U.S. Department of State, Policy Planning Staff
- 1958-61: Ambassador, Rabat, Morocco
- 1961-66: U.S. Deputy Representative to the United Nations
- 1966:
  - 1) Resigned from the Foreign Service
  - 2) Chairman, United Nations Economic Commission for Asia and the Far East (ECAFE), New Delhi
  - 3) Bureau of Near East & South Asian Affairs, State Department
- 1966-69: Senior Fellow at the Council on Foreign Relations
- 1967:
  - 1) Consultant to the State Department, member of the Panel of Advisers on Near East, South Asian and International Organizations
  - 2) American Society of International Law Proceedings, Board of Review and Development: Conflict Control by Non-Violent Means (April)
  - 3) President Johnson's Special Envoy to the Middle East (May–June)
  - 4) Carnegie Endowment for International Peace Bermuda conference on the Vietnam War (December)
- 1968:
  - 1) Head of the State Department Cyprus Study Group
  - 2) President Johnson's Special Envoy to the Middle East (July)
- 1969-71: U.S. Representative to the United Nations, New York. President of the Security Council
- 1970-80: Member of the Dartmouth Conference Delegation
- 1971: Resigned from the Foreign Service
- 1971-73:
  - 1) Counselor to UN Association
  - 2) Professor at Columbia University's School of International Affairs
- 1972: U.S. presidential envoy to Egypt
- 1973-75: President, National Committee on US-China Relations
- 1974: Professor at Rockefeller Foundation's Villa Serbelloni Study and Conference Center in Bellagio
- 1975: Presidential envoy to Egypt
- 1975-81:
  - 1) Senior Fellow, Brookings Institution
  - 2) Professor at the Institute for the Study of Diplomacy, Georgetown University
  - 3) Chairman, National Committee on US-China Relations
- 1976-81: Coordinator, Aspen Institute East-West, Iran and China Activities
- 1977: President Carter's Woodcock MIA delegation to Vietnam and Laos
- 1978: 1969 Security Council speech on Jerusalem codified in Camp David Accord Annex
- 1979:
  - 1) Co-chairman Americans for SALT Strategic Arms Limitation Talks
  - 2) Honorary Co-chairman United Nations Association of the United States

== Writings ==
- The Age of Triumph and Frustration: Modern Dialogues (Speller, 1964)
- The Insecurity of Nations: International Relations in the Twentieth Century (Praeger, 1968)
- The Pursuit of World Order (Villanova University Press, 1969)
- The Conduct and Misconduct of Foreign Affairs (Random House, 1972)
- History & Memory (Norton, 1980) - nominated for National Book Critics Circle General Non-fiction Award

Diplomatic posts
Preceded by Willys R. Peck	United States Ambassador to Thailand; Acting; 1946	Succeeded by Edwin F. Stanton
Preceded by Donald R. Heath	United States Ambassador to Laos; 1954–1956	Succeeded by J. Graham Parsons
Preceded by James S. Moose Jr.	United States Ambassador to Syria; 1958	Succeeded by Raymond A. Hare as United States Ambassador to the United Arab Republic
Preceded by Cavendish W. Cannon	United States Ambassador to Morocco; 1958–1961	Succeeded by Philip Bonsal
Preceded by James Russell Wiggins	United States Ambassador to the United Nations; 1969–1971	Succeeded by George H. W. Bush
