= James Russell Wiggins =

American managing editor of The Washington Post and government ambassador

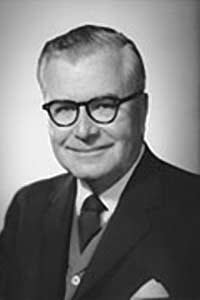
- Wiggins' photo as U.S. ambassador to the UN

8th United States Ambassador to the United Nations
- In office October 7, 1968 – January 20, 1969
- President: Lyndon B. Johnson
- Preceded by: George Ball
- Succeeded by: Charles Yost

Personal details
- Born: December 4, 1903 Luverne, Minnesota, U.S.
- Died: November 19, 2000 (aged 96) Brooklin, Maine, U.S.
- Party: Democratic

James Russell Wiggins (December 4, 1903 – November 19, 2000) was an American executive editor of The Washington Post and United States Ambassador to the United Nations.

== In Minnesota ==
James Russell Wiggins was born on December 4, 1903, to James and Edith (Binford) Wiggins. He graduated from Luverne High School in 1922, where he worked on the school newspaper, the Echo. His first professional job in journalism was as reporter for the Rock County Star in Luverne, Minnesota immediately out of high school. He then served as its advertising manager, and then associate editor (1925). In February 1926, at the age of 22, he borrowed $10,000 and bought the newspaper. In 1930, he sold the Star and moved to St. Paul to become an editorial writer for the St Paul Pioneer Press and Dispatch and later served as its Washington correspondent before becoming managing editor in 1938.

== Washington Post years ==
During World War II, Wiggins served in Army Air Corps intelligence. While serving in the army, he met Philip Graham who would later become publisher of The Washington Post.

Graham made Wiggins managing editor of The Post in 1947 and promoted him to executive editor in 1955.

One of his first acts as editor was to end racial identification in news articles. In 1954, Wiggins received the Elijah Parish Lovejoy Award as well as an honorary Doctor of Laws degree from Colby College. He was president of the American Society of Newspaper Editors in 1959–60. Wiggins took over the Post's editorial page in 1961.

He served as executive editor until President Lyndon B. Johnson appointed him U.S. ambassador to the United Nations in 1968. He was succeeded by Ben Bradlee, who had served as his managing editor since 1965.

== UN ambassador ==
President Lyndon B. Johnson appointed Wiggins U.S. ambassador to the United Nations in 1968 to 1969. In 1969, Wiggins received an LL.D. from Bates College.

== Later years ==
After his tenure as ambassador, Wiggins moved to Brooklin, Maine where he became editor and publisher of The Ellsworth American of Ellsworth, Maine. He received the Eugene Cervi Award from the International Society of Weekly Newspaper Editors in 1987.

Wiggins was married to his high school sweetheart, Mabel Preston, and their marriage lasted 67 years until her death in 1990.

Wiggins died on November 19, 2000, in his home in Brooklin, Maine at the age of 96.

Diplomatic posts
Preceded by George Ball	United States Ambassador to the United Nations; 1968–1969	Succeeded by Charles Yost
