= War and Peace Studies =

War and Peace Studies was a project carried out by the Council on Foreign Relations between 1939 and 1945 before and during American involvement in World War II. It provided strictly confidential advisories to the U.S. government on conduct in the war and the subsequent peace. Its full title was Studies of American Interests in the War and the Peace.

The project was divided into four major areas: economic and financial, security and armaments, territorial, and political. Over 100 men took part. Funding was provided by the Rockefeller Foundation, which provided almost $350,000 over the course of the project. A steering committee was created in December 1939 chaired by U.S diplomat Norman Davis with Foreign Affairs editor Hamilton Fish Armstrong as vice-chairman. Initial area heads were:

- Alvin Hansen and Jacob Viner led the economic and financial group
- Whitney Shepardson, who led the political group
- Allen Welsh Dulles and Hanson W. Baldwin, who led the armaments group, and
- Isaiah Bowman, who led the territorial group.

A research secretary was appointed to each group:

- William Diebold, for the economic and financial group
- Walter R. Sharp, for the political group, and
- Grayson L. Kirk, for the armaments group
- William P. Maddox, for the territorial group

From March 1942, the project supplied research secretaries to the State Department's Advisory Committee on Postwar Foreign Policy, with each group's secretary serving the corresponding subcommittee at the State Department. Meetings were scheduled to allow secretaries to carry out Council work during the first half of each week with the remainder of the week spent at the Department of State.
