= Pennsylvania Railroad class D6 =

Pennsylvania Railroad D6
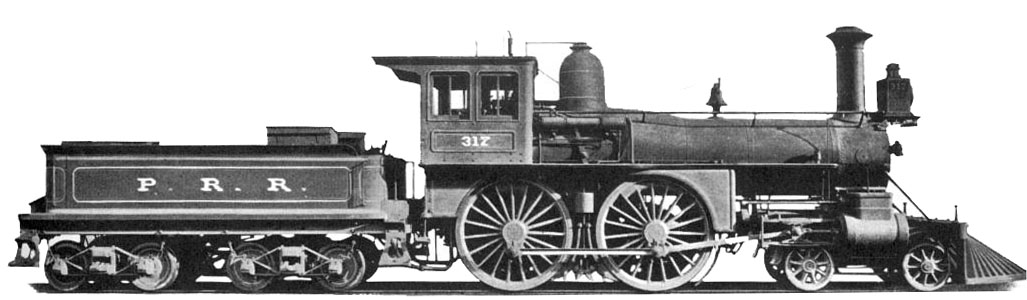
- PRR D6 #317 in its builders' portrait
Type and origin
- Power type: Steam
- Designer: Theodore N. Ely
- Builder: PRR Altoona Works
- Build date: 1881–1883
- Total produced: 19
Specifications
- Configuration
  - Whyte: 4-4-0
  - UIC: 2′B
- Gauge: 4 ft 8 1/2 in (1,435 mm)
- Leading dia.: 33 in (838 mm)
- Driver dia.: 78 in (1,981 mm)
- Wheelbase: 22 ft 8 1/2 in (6.92 m)
- Length: 58 ft 0.3 in (17.69 m)
- Height: 15 ft 0 in (4.57 m)
- Axle load: 32,900 lb (14.9 tonnes)
- Adhesive weight: 58,800 lb (26.7 tonnes)
- Loco weight: 96,700 lb (43.9 tonnes)
- Total weight: 153,000 lb (69.4 tonnes)
- Fuel type: Soft coal
- Fuel capacity: 12,000 lb (5.4 tonnes)
- Water cap.: 2,400 US gal (9,100 L; 2,000 imp gal)
- Firebox
  - Grate area: 34.76 sq ft (3.23 m^{2})
- Boiler pressure: 140 lbf/in^{2} (970 kPa)
- Heating surface
  - Firebox: 155 sq ft (14.40 m^{2})
  - Tubes: 1,085 sq ft (100.80 m^{2})
  - Total surface: 1,240 sq ft (115.20 m^{2})
- Cylinders: 2
- Cylinder size: 18 in × 24 in (460 mm × 610 mm)
- Valve gear: Stephenson
Performance figures
- Tractive effort: 11,170 lbf (49.69 kN) (D6); 12,800 lbf (56.94 kN) (D6a)
- Factor of adh.: 5.3 (D6) 4.6 (D6a)

Class D6 (formerly Class K, pre-1895) on the Pennsylvania Railroad was a class of 4-4-0 steam locomotive. Nineteen were built by the PRR's Altoona Works (now owned by Norfolk Southern) between 1881 and 1883. They were equipped with 78-inch (1,981 mm) drivers. Seven were later converted to 72-inch (1,829 mm) drivers and classified D6a.

The D6 was one of the first American 4-4-0s to place the firebox above, rather than between, the locomotive's frames. This added about 8 inches to the possible width of the firebox, enabling a larger, easier to fire and more powerful locomotive; the maximum fire grate area increased to about 35 sq ft (3.25 m^{2}) from the previous maximum of about 18 sq ft (1.67 m^{2}).

The innovation was not wholly new, having been first seen on the Philadelphia and Reading Railroad's 1859 Vera Cruz, designed by James Milholland of that road and built in their own shops; the Reading used this design until the invention of the Wootten firebox in 1877. It was subsequently adopted by the Baldwin Locomotive Works in 1881 for six locomotives constructed for the Central Railroad of New Jersey; these were followed by the Pennsylvania Railroad locomotives, which garnered more attention for this design feature, in addition to having larger drivers than most previous 4-4-0s.
