= Clara Pasvolsky =

Russian contralto singer (1889–1976)

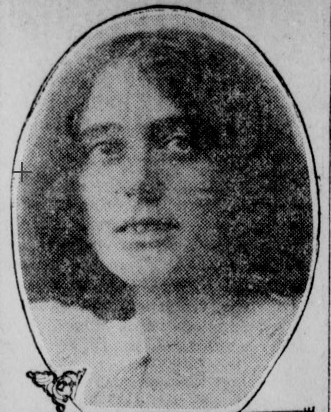
Clara Pasvolsky, from a 1920 newspaper.

Clara Pasvolsky (born 21 August (2 September) 1889, Pavlograd, Russian Empire — died 29 February 1976, California, US) was a Russian contralto singer.

== Early life ==
Clara Pasvolsky was born in Jewish family in Pavlograd, Russian Empire. Her family moved to the United States in 1905. Her brother, Leo Pasvolsky, became a journalist and an economist, and later an important figure in the formation of the United Nations. Another brother, Valentine Pasvolsky, was a recognized expert on numismatics.

== Career ==
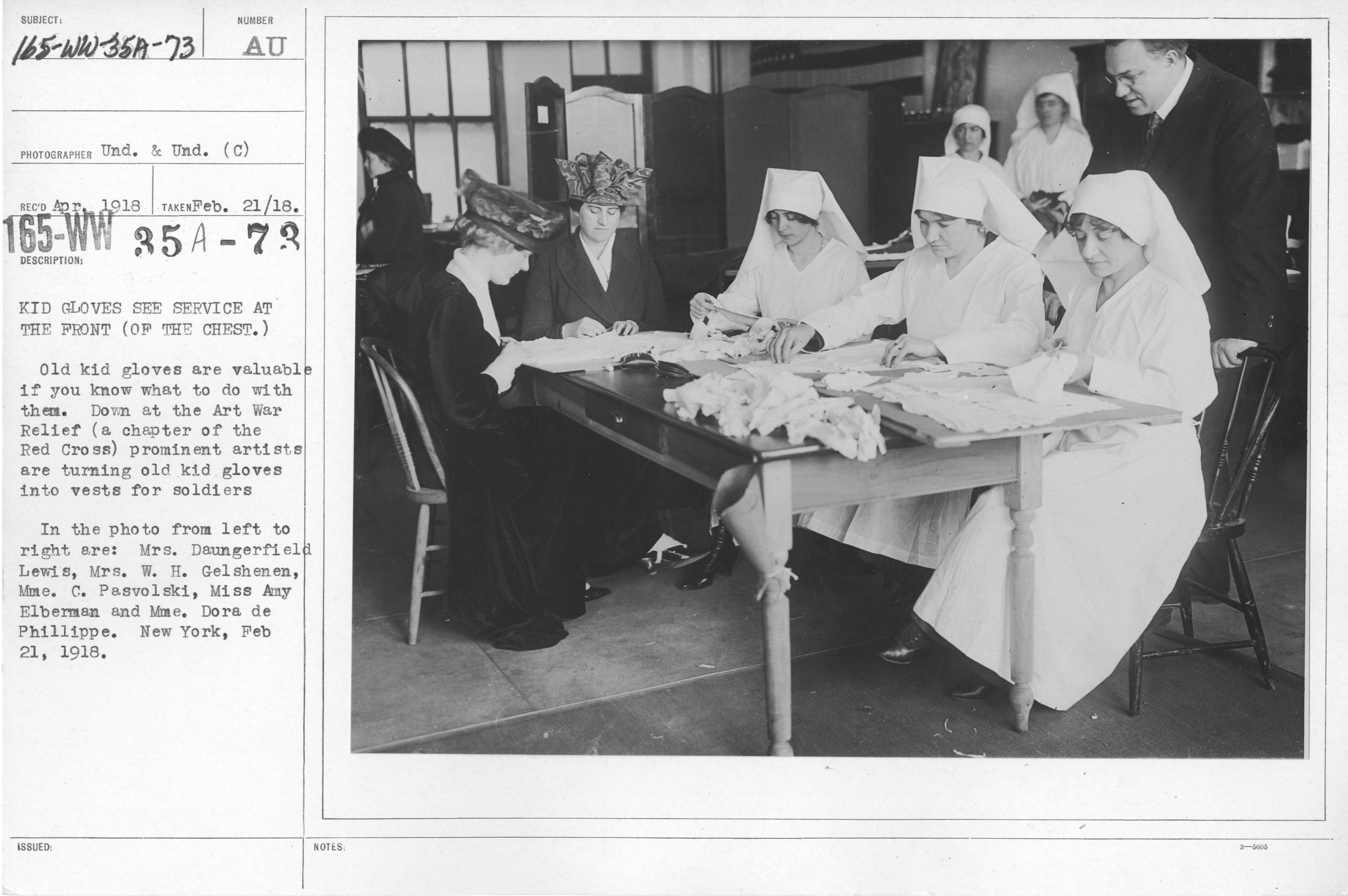
American Red Cross – Classes in Red Cross Work – Clara Pasvolsky is seated at center, remaking kid gloves into vests for soldiers; NARA – 20802078

As a young woman, from about 1909 to 1913, Pasvolsky directed the play room at the University Settlement house in New York. She had her first New York recital in 1917. Soon after, she was part of a benefit concert and show for Russian refugee and war relief. Pasvolsky gave a concert of Russian songs at the Aeolian Hall in New York in 1918. That same year, she performed with her mentor, baritone Alexis Rienzi, in a program of all Russian songs. In 1920 she performed in Santa Ana, California, and joined William Butler Yeats, Ariadna Roumanova, Olga Steeb, and other artists and musicians in Los Angeles, to celebrate the birthday of King Albert of Belgium. She wore a Russian dress on stage, and presented works by both well-known and lesser-known Russian composers. "Miss Pasvolsky is of the type which we immediately connect with our experience of the Russian 'temperament' at its most musical," noted the Los Angeles Times in 1920.

She made a recording in 1919 for the Victor Talking Machine Company.

She changed her name from Clara to Carla by 1942, and used the married name Sattler. She lived in Long Beach, California and remained active and interested in the arts. Carla Sattler loaned an "antique Russian samovar" to the Musical Arts Club in Long Beach in 1948, and joined a Long Beach committee to bring the Metropolitan Opera Company to Los Angeles in 1949.

== Personal life ==
Clara Pasvolsky married August Sattler, a chemist, 31 August 1927 in New York. Carla Sattler was listed as a survivor in her brother Leo Pasvolsky's 1953 obituary. August died 9 April 1940.
