= James T. Shotwell =

Canadian-American historian (1874–1965)

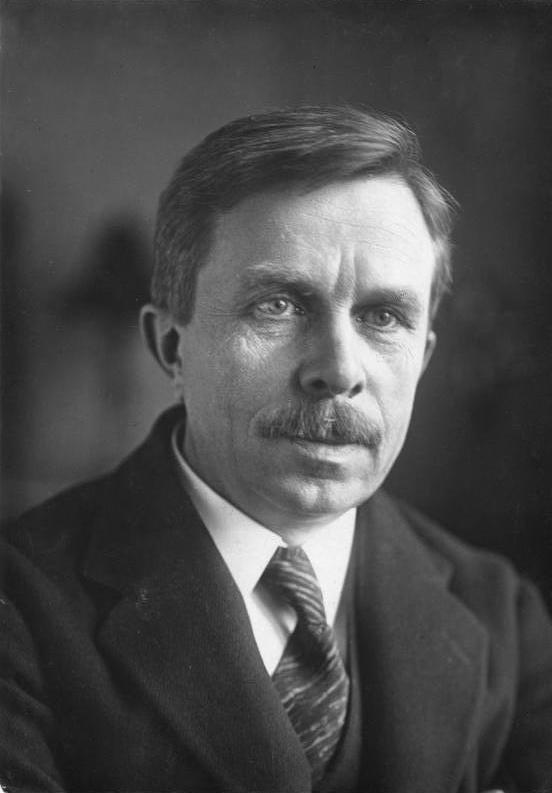
- James T. Shotwell (1920)
- Born: August 6, 1874; Strathroy, Ontario, Canada
- Died: July 15, 1965 (aged 90); Manhattan, New York City, New York, United States
- Education: University of Toronto; Columbia University
- Known for: International Labour Organization, inclusion of declaration of human rights in UN Charter
- Spouse: Margaret Harvey
- Children: Helen Harvey Shotwell; Margaret Grace Shotwell Summers

James Thomson Shotwell (August 6, 1874 – July 15, 1965) was a Canadian-born American history professor. He played an instrumental role in the creation of the International Labour Organization (ILO) in 1919, as well as for his influence in promoting inclusion of a declaration of human rights in the UN Charter.

== Career ==
=== Background ===
Shotwell was born in Strathroy, Ontario, to American Quaker parents.

He obtained a B.A. from the University of Toronto in 1898. He obtained his doctorate from Columbia University in 1903, where he studied under James Harvey Robinson.

Columbia University's alumni magazine records:

At Columbia he encountered a lively intellectual community, seized with debates about the "New History." He quickly adopted his adviser’s view that the increasingly influential "scientific" methods of studying society might be applied to the practice of history and he applied them in his dissertation in medieval history, "A Study of the History of the Eucharist." He would later observe that although he took "a semester on the history of international law, by the distinguished jurist John Basset Moore, later a judge on the World Court... this was the only course that had any bearing on international relations in the faculty of Political Science, a subject... on which most of my later life was spent."

=== Academics ===
At Columbia, Shotwell became a lecturer in history in 1900, an instructor in 1903, and adjunct professor in 1905.

To underwrite studies overseas, he began writing articles for the Encyclopædia Britannica; soon, he became managing editor of its eleventh edition. This work provided a good salary, honed his organizational skills, and led to his meeting people like Bertrand Russell and Henry Ford. Eventually, he wrote some 250 articles.

In 1908, he became full professor. His interest lay in particular with the influence of science and technology on historical change and international relations.

In 1917, he became director of research at the Carnegie Endowment for International Peace, where Columbia's president, Nicholas Murray Butler who was also president.

In 1927, he became the first chair of the advisory committee on international relations of the newly formed Social Science Research Council. He then became director of planning and research in international relations.

In 1930, he returned to Columbia full-time. In 1937, he was appointed Bryce Professor of the History of International Relations at Columbia University. He retired from full-time teaching at Columbia in 1942. During his time at Columbia, he was elected a member of the American Philosophical Society.

All in all, he studied and taught at Columbia for nearly 50 years, where his closest friends were fellow professors Robinson and Charles A. Beard.

=== Political contributions ===
Shotwell attended the Paris Peace Conference as a member of "The Inquiry" (a study group established by Woodrow Wilson to prepare materials for the peace negotiations), historian of the American delegation, and author of the provisions establishing the International Labour Organization (ILO). He then he worked to counter U.S. isolationism and to promote U.S. entry into the League of Nations.

He met with the French Minister of Foreign Affairs Aristide Briand in Paris and suggested that a bilateral treaty be negotiated that would outlaw war between the U.S. and France. Their work led to the Kellogg-Briand Pact being signed on August 27, 1928.

In 1932, he met Senator Cordell Hull at the Democratic national convention; Hull went on to become Roosevelt's Secretary of State the following year. In 1934, Shotwell campaigned for Congress to authorize U.S. membership in the ILO. In 1935, he became president of the League of Nations Association, whose executive director had been Clark Eichelberger since 1933.

In 1939, William Allen White, editor of the Gazette of Emporia, Kansas, along with Eichelberger and Shotwell, established the Non-Partisan Committee for Peace Through Revision of the Neutrality Acts. They formed an Eichelberger-White Committee to Defend America by Aiding the Allies, founded in May 1940. Eichelberger and Shotwell created a Commission to Study the Organization of Peace (CSOP), which Virginia Gildersleeve supported. The CSOP conducted studies, held popular radio discussion shows and through national and local affiliates became a powerful engine of mass education on behalf of collective security. The CSOP applauded the Moscow Four Power Declaration of November 1, 1943, and issued a report on "Fundamentals of the International Organization." Under Edward Stettinius, the State Department used this report for its Dumbarton Oaks proposals. Shotwell worked closely with Under Secretary of State Sumner Welles.

In May 1944, he joined a group that published a "Design for the Charter of the General International Organization" to succeed the ruined League of Nations. The United States, Britain, the Soviet Union, and China all issued proposals after the Dumbarton Oaks Conference in October 1944 of that year that closely paralleled those of the "Shotwell Commission". He organized an educational campaign to support the United Nations. He attended the first UN meeting in San Francisco in April 1945 (where Alger Hiss was serving as acting secretary general) as a consultant representing Carnegie, then elected by 42 U.S. consultants there to lead their delegation. He helped draft the Charter of the United Nations as a private consultant to the U.S. State Department.

From 1949 to 1950, he served as the Director of Economics and History (1942–49) then president of the Carnegie Endowment for International Peace – succeeding Alger Hiss, who was indicted in the wake of allegations by Whittaker Chambers that became the "Hiss Case."

=== Nobel nomination ===
In 1952, Shotwell was nominated for the 1952 Nobel Peace Prize, which went un-awarded until the following year, when Albert Schweizer received it.

== Private life ==
=== Marriage ===
Shotwell married Margaret Harvey in 1901 and they had two daughters, Helen Harvey and Margaret Grace. In 1937, their daughter Margaret married Llewelyn L. B. Summers, the son of Leland L. Summers and Eve Brodlique Summers.

=== Woodstock ===
He maintained a home in Woodstock, New York, and was instrumental in getting American artist Anita Miller Smith to become a writer and to publish the service record of all Woodstock people who had fought in the war as part of Smith's 1959 book on the town's official history.

=== Death ===
Shotwell died of a stroke at his apartment at 257 West 86th Street in Manhattan at age 90.

== Legacy ==
The James T. Shotwell Professor of International Relations chair at Columbia University was named in his honor.

In summarizing his career, Lisa Anderson (then dean of Columbia University's School of International and Public Affairs) wrote:

James T. Shotwell represented the first generation of genuinely cosmopolitan American policy intellectuals. His obituary in the New York Times observed that he was "among the most respected and dedicated protagonists of internationalism in the United States," a man who saw "the world as a whole." In many respects, this vision was to remain a minority view in the United States, particularly as the Cold War consumed the second half of the twentieth century, and Shotwell was well aware of the obstacles to its realization. Reflecting on the impact of what he called "the great communist controversy" on the United Nations, he wrote that "the full and adequate implementation of the revolutionary concept in the Charter may be long delayed." He was, however, at heart an irredeemable optimist: "The success or failure of that organization is a measure of civilization itself. There can be no surer guarantee of its ultimate success."

Shotwell's combination of scholarly enthusiasm, pragmatic engagement in the world, and abiding optimism, his conviction that social scientists should deploy their learning to public purposes, his faith that human intervention might improve the human condition, and his ability to "see the world as a whole" became hallmarks of Columbia's study of international relations.

== Works ==
In addition to his many books, Shotwell was co-author of several studies on international relations and was the editor of a series of 150 volumes of the Economic and Social History of the World War as well as a series of 25 studies on Canadian-American relations, both sponsored by the Carnegie Endowment for International Peace. He also contributed nearly 250 articles to the 11th edition of the Encyclopædia Britannica. He co-authored The Diplomatic History of the Canadian Boundary, 1749-1763 with Max Savelle.

His books include:

- The Religious Revolution of To-day (1913)
- An Introduction to the History of History (1922)
- Plans and Protocols to End War (1925)
- War as an Instrument of National Policy (1929)
- The Origins of the International Labor Organization (1934)
- On the Rim of the Abyss (1936)
- At the Paris Peace Conference (1937)
- The Great Decision (1944)
- The Life of Woodrow Wilson: An Outline for a Course of Study (1944) [Distributed in movie theaters showing Darryl F. Zanuck's movie, Wilson.]
- The Long Way to Freedom (1960)

== External sources ==
- Anderson, Lisa (Winter 2005). "James T. Shotwell: A Life Devoted to Organizing Peace". Living Legacies (alumni magazine of Columbia University).
- Josephson, Harold (1974). James T. Shotwell and the Rise of Internationalism in America. Madison, NJ: Fairleigh Dickinson University Press. ISBN 0-8386-1524-4.
- Killough, Patrick (21 February 2009) [26 July 1991]. "James Thomson Shotwell: Leader of the Private American Consultants at San Francisco, Nominated in 1952 for the Nobel Peace Prize". Patrick Killough (retired diplomat of the Foreign Service of the United States of America). Archived from the original on 21 June 2013.
- Korey, William (1998). NGOs and the Universal Declaration of Human Rights: A Curious Grapevine. New York: St Martin's Press.
