= Elmwood (Oyster Bay, New York) =

Historic house in New York, United States

- U.S. National Register of Historic Places
- Location within New York Location within the United States
- Location: E side of Cove Rd., Oyster Bay, New York
- Coordinates: 40°51′59″N 73°29′45″W
- Area: 26 acres (11 ha)
- Built: 1836
- Architectural style: Greek Revival
- NRHP reference No.: 75001200
- Added to NRHP: April 3, 1975

Elmwood, also known as "The Cliffs," is a historic home located at Oyster Bay in Nassau County, New York. It was built in 1836 for New York merchant Thomas F. Youngs (1805–1883) in the Greek Revival style. The original house is a 2-story, gable-roofed, five-by-three-bay wood-frame house. It was expanded about 1915 during its ownership by Charles L. Tiffany II (1878–1947), son of Louis Comfort Tiffany (1848–1933), and his wife, the suffragist and philanthropist, Katrina Brandes Ely Tiffany (1875–1927). It features a prominent cornice and architrave and an imposing tetrastyle Ionic order portico. Also on the property are an assortment of 19th century dependencies including a gazebo, tool shed, ice house, greenhouse, barns, and a brick coach house built in 1918 by Mr. Tiffany. The property also features a tall, octagonal, board and batten water tower.

It was listed on the National Register of Historic Places in 1975.
