= Jean de Muralt =

Swiss lawyer and executive (1877–1947)

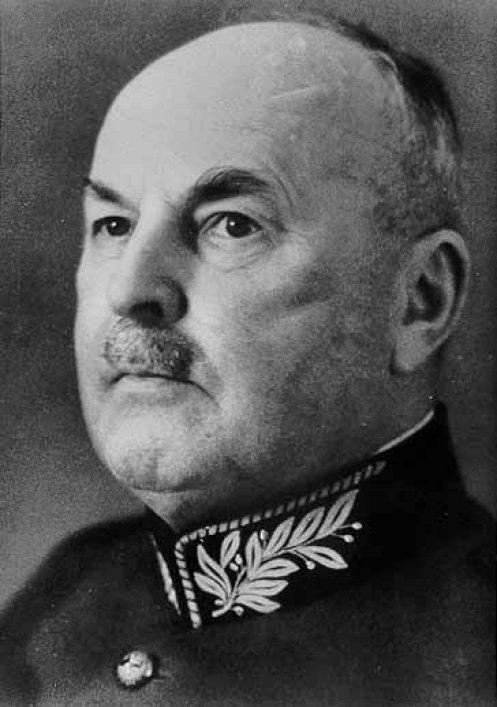
Johannes von Muralt

Jean de Muralt or Johannes von Muralt (18 July 1877, Zurich - 10 November 1947, Zurich), was a Swiss lawyer and the Chairman of the Board of Governors of the League of Red Cross Societies (now the International Federation of Red Cross and Red Crescent Societies) from 1944 to 1945.

He studied jurisprudence at the Universities of Berlin, Munich and Zurich, and in 1902 completed his studies with a dissertation on parliamentary immunity in Germany and Switzerland. From 1903 to 1907 he worked as a district attorney, and from 1908 to 1932 worked in the Swiss Army as an artillery-training officer. In 1913, he was promoted to staff officer, in 1926 to Oberst then in 1932 to Divisionär. From 1932 to 1937, he was Oberstdivisionärs Kommandant of Zürcher Felddivision 6.

In 1938, he became president of the Swiss Red Cross and held the office until 1946. During the Second World War, from 1940 to 1941, he was Swiss Federal Commissar for Internment and Hospitalisation. From 1944 to 1945, after the death of Norman Davis, he took over the leadership of the League of Red Cross Societies, now the International Federation of Red Cross and Red Crescent Societies. He was the organization's first non-US chairman since it was founded in 1919. His successor was Basil O'Connor.

Non-profit organization positions
Preceded by Norman Davis	Chairman of the International League of Red Cross Societies; 1944–1945	Succeeded by Basil O'Connor
