= Advisory Committee on Problems of Foreign Relations =

The Advisory Committee on Problems of Foreign Relations was a committee created by United States Secretary of State Cordell Hull on December 27, 1939, to examine "overseas war measures." It came about after Leo Pasvolsky, Hull's assistant, wrote a memorandum urging such a committee concerned with "problems of peace and reconstruction" that would review fundamental principles of a "desirable world order" and was originally called the Committee on Problems of Peace and Reconstruction. It was one of many such committees that Hull would create, reorganize, rename or abolish. Successors included the Division of Special Research and the Advisory Committee on Postwar Foreign Policy.

Under Secretary of State Sumner Welles was chairman of the fifteen member committee, which included two people from outside the State Department, Norman Davis of the Council on Foreign Relations and George Rublee of the Intergovernmental Committee on Political Refugees. Pasvolsky headed the economics subcommittee. Other members from the State Department included Assistant Secretary Adolf A. Berle, Herbert Feis and Political Advisor Stanley K. Hornbeck. The committee came up with tentative ideas about a world organization, reviving some aspects of the League of Nations design. The sketch included an "Executive Council" and a "General Assembly" with different powers, but the League's principle of unanimity was to be replaced by some type of majority rule. The organization was envisioned to be based on nine regional blocs represented in the assembly, and with an independent police force. After the phony war in Europe became a real one, the committee became defunct in the summer of 1940.
