= Theodore N. Ely =

American railroad executive (1846–1916)

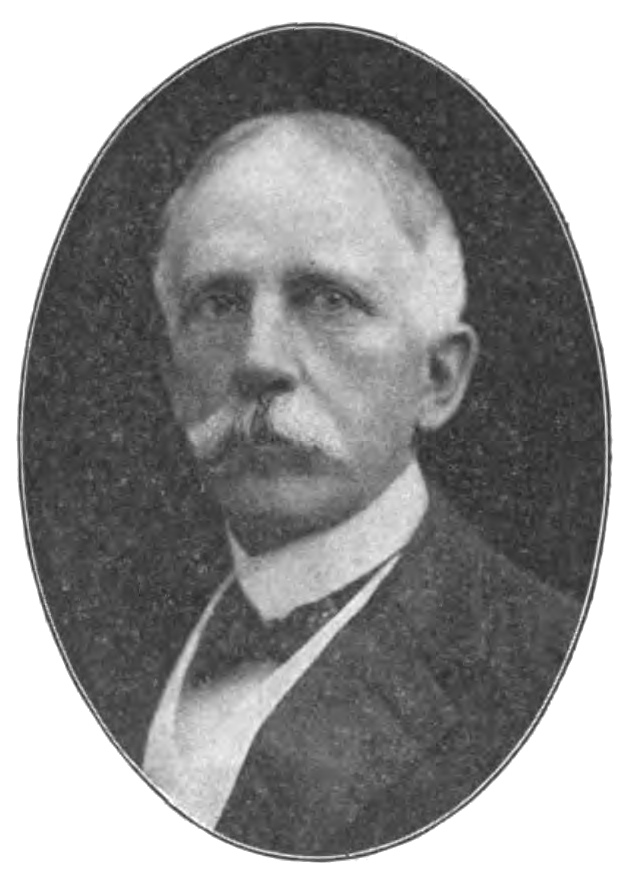
Theodore N. Ely c. 1911

Theodore Newel Ely (July 23, 1846 – October 29, 1916) was an executive in charge of steam locomotive power development and purchases on the Pennsylvania Railroad, one of the largest railroad systems and business concerns in the United States.

Upon his retirement in 1911 after forty-three years with the Pennsylvania, the trade periodical Railway Age Gazette recounted Ely's career, his accomplishments and accolades.

Perhaps his most recognizable innovation, per Railway Age Gazette, was the relocation of the steam locomotive boiler and fire box. Prior to the 1881-3 design of the Pennsylvania's Class K 4-4-0 American Standard steam locomotives (later reclassified to the Pennsylvania's Class D6 4-4-0 American Standards), most fire boxes were located between the frames of locomotives, restricting their width, and thus, the power of the locomotive. Ely's design moved the fire box and boiler assembly above the drive wheels, creating a design which was more powerful, as well as easier to stoke. The area available to burn coal, and thus power the locomotive, was increased from eighteen to nearly thirty-five square feet. The change, considered radical at the time, created a design which observers believed would run roughly and prove top-heavy and unstable. Railway Age Gazette noted in 1911:

"It was Mr. Ely that took the first step alone, against the protests of many by whom he was surrounded, that has led to the development of the large locomotives of today. While builders and engineers considered that the end had come, that the locomotive had reached the limit of its power because of the restrictions current construction put upon the size of the firebox, Mr. Ely lifted his whole boiler into the air, set his foundation ring on top of the frames, widened his firebox and gave the machine a new lease of life. Many and dire were the predictions made as to the instability of the new design, but we all know the result. It did not upset, but ran with unexampled smoothness and with construction revolutionized the whole country followed in his wake. This is but a single example of his work."

The design proved so revolutionary that "Ely's No. 10," one of the class K American Standards, was issued as a U.S. postage stamp in 1977. The U.S. Postal Service wrote of Ely's design: "It was among the fastest express locomotives in the United States during the 1880s. No. 10 was a prototype and considered a remarkably advanced design at the time of its introduction."

In his retirement tribute, the Gazette included an anecdote from an unnamed co-worker off the Pennsylvania:

"As one of his associates expressed it, 'He was the balance wheel of the mechanical organization of the road,' and if these same associates are to be believed it is to his influence that the wonderful teamwork of the various departments is largely due."

By 1911 Ely was a member of the American Society of Civil Engineers, the Institution of Civil Engineers (Great Britain), the American Society of Mechanical Engineers, the American Institute of Mining Engineers, the Franklin Institute, the American Philosophical Society, the American Association for the Advancement of Science, other technical and scientific associations, vice-president of the American Academy in Rome and an honorary member of the American Institute of Architects, president of the Eastern Railroad Association, a member of the executive committee of the American Railway Association and of the permanent commission of the International Railway Congress.

Ely was also a director of the Pennsylvania Steel Company and the Cambria Steel Company and of the boards of trustees of the Drexel Institute of Art Science and Industry and of the Philadelphia Commercial Museum.

Before his retirement, Ely was awarded an honorary Masters of Arts by Yale University in 1897. In 1904 he was awarded an honorary Doctor of Science by Hamilton College. He died October 28, 1916, at his home Wyndham, at Bryn Mawr, Pennsylvania.

For his contributions to early American railroading Ely is listed by the Smithsonian Institutions' John H. White Jr., as one of America's most noteworthy railroaders.

His daughter Gertrude Sumner Ely was twice awarded the Croix de Guerre for bravery in World War I; another daughter, Katrina Brandes Ely, married Charles L. Tiffany II in 1901, and was president of the New York Collegiate Equal Franchise League.
