= Isaiah Bowman =

American geographer (1878–1950)

- Born: December 26, 1878; Waterloo, Ontario, Canada
- Died: January 6, 1950 (aged 71); Baltimore, Maryland, United States
- Education: Harvard University; Yale University
- Known for: Founding Director, American Geographical Society; President, Johns Hopkins University
- Scientific career
- Fields: Geography
- Workplaces: American Geographical Society; Johns Hopkins University; The Explorers Club

Isaiah Bowman (December 26, 1878 – January 6, 1950), was an American geographer and President of the Johns Hopkins University, 1935–1948. He was controversial for his antisemitism and inaction in Jewish resettlement during World War II.

== Biography ==
Bowman was born in Waterloo, Ontario, Canada. His family was Mennonite and of Swiss descent, and, at the age of eight weeks, Bowman's father moved his family to a log cabin in Brown City, Michigan, sixty miles north of Detroit. In 1900, Isaiah became an American citizen and began intensive study to prepare himself for admittance to Harvard. Studying first at Michigan State Normal College in Ypsilanti (now Eastern Michigan University), Bowman came to the attention of Mark Jefferson, a geographer who had studied at Harvard under the most prominent geographer of the day, William Morris Davis. Jefferson recommended Bowman to Davis, smoothing the way for Bowman's study. After one year, by prearrangement with Jefferson, Bowman returned to Michigan in 1903 for a year, before returning again to Harvard.

After graduating from Harvard in 1905, he became an instructor and graduate student at Yale, where he stayed for ten years. While at Yale, Bowman participated in three study expeditions to South America, in 1907, 1911 and 1913; on the third trip, he served as the leader of the group. This research provided material for his PhD dissertation, conferred in 1909, and for several publications. In 1915, he became the first director of the American Geographical Society (AGS).

Some of his more notable works include:

- Forest Physiography (1911)
- Well-Drilling Methods (1911)
- South America: A Geography Reader (1915)
- The Andes of Southern Peru (1916)
- The New World-Problems in Political Geography (1921). Many reprints.
- Desert Trails of Atacama (1924).
- The Pioneer Fringe (1931)
- Main Editor of Limits of Land Settlement (1937)

In his writings, he criticized oppression of the indigenous and laborers in the Andes.

When the United States entered the First World War in 1917, Bowman placed the resources of the AGS at the government's service, and he was asked to "gather and prepare data" to assist with a future peace conference once the fighting stopped. Bowman sailed for France in December 1918 as Chief Territorial Specialist, but he quickly assumed an administrative role as well, gaining the ear of President Woodrow Wilson and his chief adviser, Colonel Edward House. Bowman thus played a major role in determining distribution of land areas and national borders, especially in the Balkans, as part of the Paris Peace Conference.

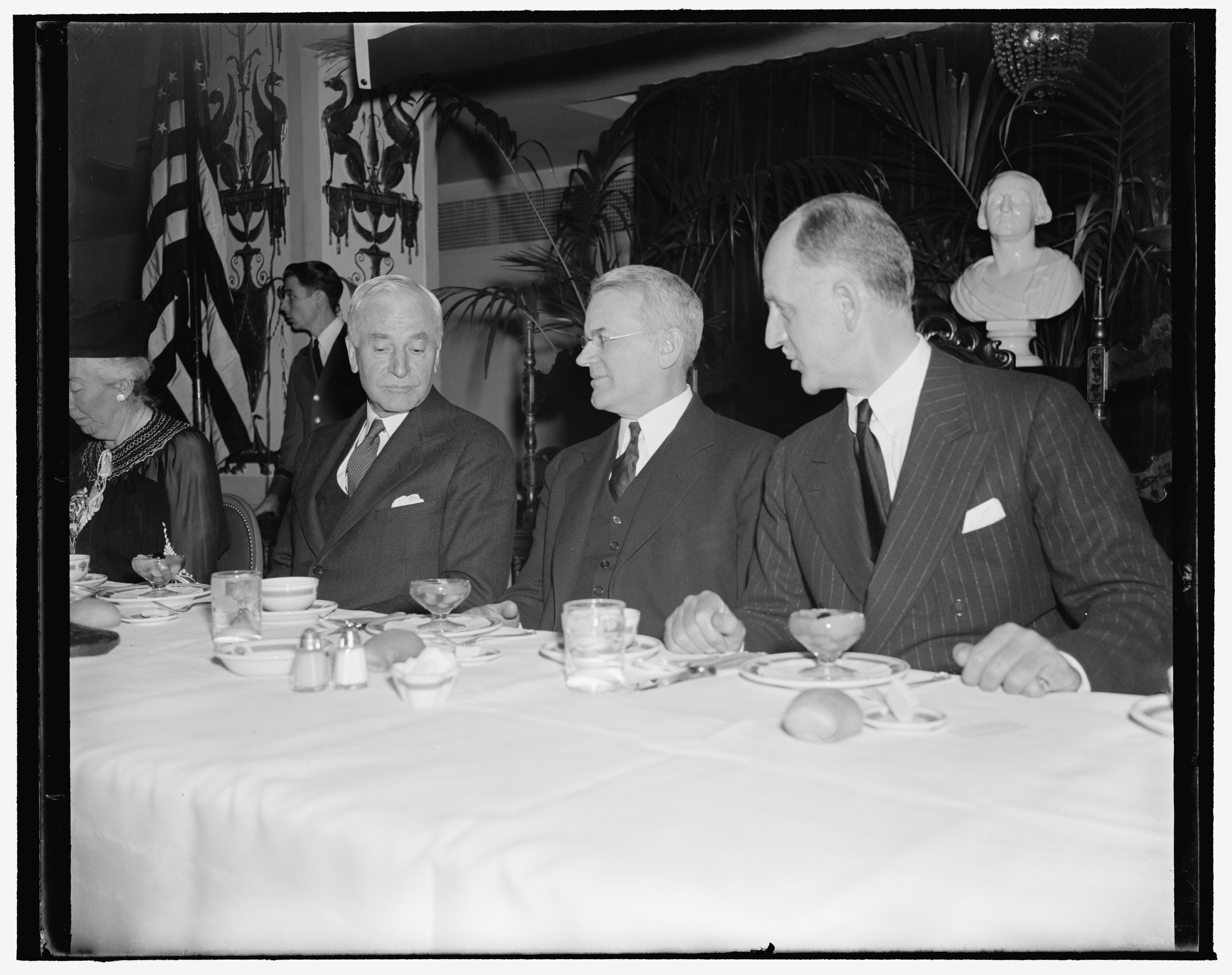
Inter-American Education Conference, Secretary of State Cordell Hull, Dr. Isiah Bowman, and Undersecretary of State Sumner Welles.

Bowman directed the American Geographical Society until 1935, when he was named the fifth president of the Johns Hopkins University, succeeding Joseph Sweetman Ames. Bowman inherited a growing deficit due to the Great Depression and he began working to reduce the deficit and build the university's endowment. By the late 1930s, Hopkins was back on stable financial ground. Continuing his government service, Bowman became a State Department adviser to President Franklin D. Roosevelt during the Second World War, spending part of each week in Washington, DC, and leaving the running of the university in the hands of Provost P. Stewart Macaulay.

In 1942, with Bowman's strong encouragement, Hopkins founded a facility that became the Applied Physics Laboratory, where scientists perfected the proximity fuze, a device that could explode an artillery shell near a target, rather than on contact or in a place where the target was predicted to be. This fuze aided greatly in repelling Japanese kamikaze attacks late in the war, and in the Ardennes region of Europe during the 1944 Battle of the Bulge. As a State Department adviser, Bowman participated in the Dumbarton Oaks Conference and the San Francisco Conference, playing a role in the founding of the United Nations.

Upon the conclusion of the Second World War, Bowman relinquished his State Department position and once again became a full-time university president. He presided over Hopkins’ return to a peacetime status, planning for the influx of ex-military personnel as they returned to civilian status and resumed their education.

His pet post-war project became the establishment of a school of geography at Johns Hopkins. As with many non-defense disciplines, geography had languished during the war years, and it became Bowman's mission to build geography into a full-fledged division of the university. He was briefly successful, but the Isaiah Bowman School of Geography was never able to attract a high-profile scholar to give it the prestige it needed. Isaiah Bowman retired from the Hopkins presidency at the end of 1948, and died just over a year later. Shortly after his death, the School of Geography was downgraded to department status, and, by 1968, his name was removed from the department.

In 1916, he became associate editor of the Geographical Review. He was associate editor of the Journal of Geography in 1918−19 and editor in 1919−20. In 1921 he became a director of the newly formed Council of Foreign Relations.

Before and during World War II he served on the Council of Foreign Relations' War and Peace Studies project as chairman of its territorial group. From 1945 to 1949 he was a CFR vice-president.

Bowman was elected to the American Academy of Arts and Sciences in 1916, the American Philosophical Society in 1923, and the United States National Academy of Sciences in 1930. In 1941 he was awarded the British Royal Geographical Society's Patron's Medal for his travels in South America and his services to Geography.

In 1944, he was honored by The Explorers Club to become an Honorary Member, and in 1950 he was given the highest award issued by The Explorers Club when he received the Explorers Medal.

== Project M and Antisemitism ==
In 1939, Roosevelt appointed Bowman to head Project M, to find refuge for Jewish emigrants from Europe. According to "harrowing" evidence uncovered by Bowman's biographer Neil Smith, news of mass slaughter of Jews in Europe did not increase Bowman's sense of urgency for rescue or swift resettlement elsewhere. Bowman's team looked for uninhabited or sparsely settled land on five continents, but not in the US. Roosevelt knew well Bowman's antisemitism and that Bowman would not cause a political uproar by encouraging resettlement of Jews in America.

Bowman's opposition to accepting Jewish refugees stemmed from his deep antisemitism. At the Johns Hopkins University, he established an anti-Jewish admissions quota in 1945, when other leading universities were dismantling their Jewish quota systems, on grounds that Jews were an alien threat to American culture.

Bowman was a known anti-Semite: extremely suspect of Jews and reluctant to hire them at the university. According to Neil Smith, Bowman fired one of the most promising young historians on the Johns Hopkins faculty in 1939, saying "there are already too many Jews at Hopkins." In American Empire, Bowman is further quoted as saying "Jews don't come to Hopkins to make the world better or anything like that. They come for two things: to make money and to marry a non-Jewish woman." In 1942, Bowman instituted a quota on the admission of Jewish students.

Archival research of private letters reveals Bowman intensely disliked the only tenured geography professor at Harvard, Derwent S. Whittlesey, for his scholarship and homosexuality.

== Bowman Expeditions ==
Beginning in 2005, the American Geographical Society has helped launch international collaborative research projects, called the Bowman Expeditions in Bowman's honor, in part to advise the U.S. government concerning future trends in the human terrain of other countries. The first project, in Mexico, is called Mexico Indigena, and has generated considerable controversy, including a public statement from the Union of Organizations of the Sierra Juarez of Oaxaca (UNOSJO) denouncing Mexico Indigena's lack of full disclosure regarding funding procured from the DOD, via the U.S. Army's Foreign Military Services Office, Ft. Leavenworth, Kansas.
