= Katrina Ely Tiffany =

American suffragist and philanthropist (1875–1927)

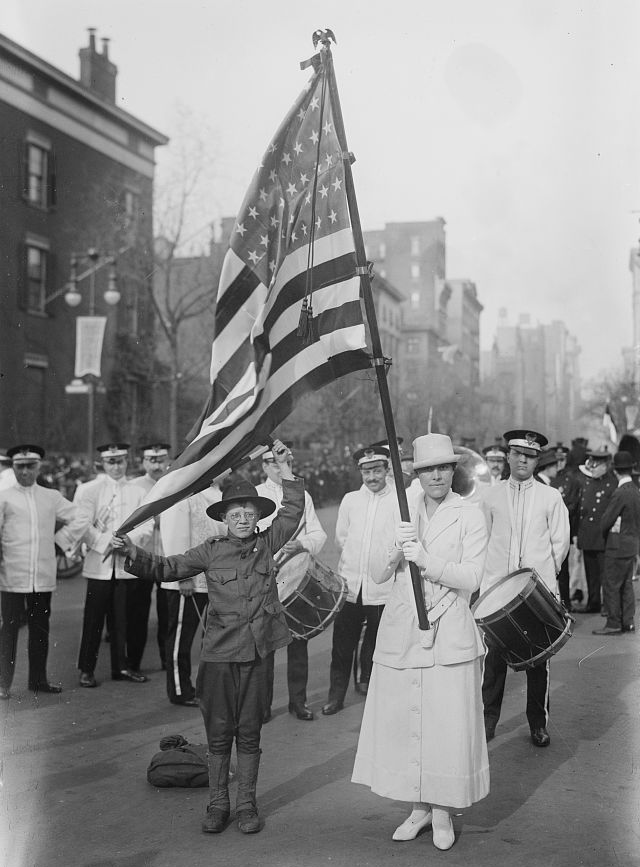
- Tiffany carrying the American flag in a suffrage parade in New York City, 1917
- Born: Katrina Brandes Ely; March 25, 1875; Altoona, Pennsylvania, US
- Died: March 11, 1927 (aged 51); New York City, US
- Education: Bryn Mawr College
- Known for: suffrage leadership, philanthropy
- Spouse: Charles Louis Tiffany II (m. 1901)
- Parent: Theodore N. Ely
- Relatives: Gertrude Sumner Ely (sister), Louis Comfort Tiffany (father-in-law)

Katrina Brandes Ely Tiffany (March 25, 1875 – March 11, 1927) was an American suffragist and philanthropist, from a prominent Philadelphia family.

== Early life ==
Katrina Brandes Ely was born March 25, 1875, in Altoona, Pennsylvania, the daughter of Theodore N. Ely and Henrietta van Siden Brandes Ely. Her father was vice president of the Pennsylvania Railroad. She attended the Baldwin School, and graduated from Bryn Mawr College in 1897.

Her sister Gertrude Sumner Ely was a noted philanthropist, who was twice awarded the Croix de Guerre for bravery in World War I.

== Career ==
Despite her husband's opposition to suffrage work, Tiffany was president of the New York Collegiate Equal Franchise League, and an officer of the Woman Suffrage Party of New York, and was a regular speaker at the Glen Cove Equal Suffrage Club near, Elmwood, her summer home on Long Island. In 1916, she was in the "cordon of honor" at the Atlantic City Suffrage Convention, welcoming President Wilson to the event. She led a 1917 suffrage parade in New York City, carrying a large American flag. After suffrage was won, she was active in the League of Women Voters, campaigned for James W. Wadsworth, and advocated for the League of Nations. In 1920, she wrote an article for Harper's Bazaar titled "Women of To-Morrow Need the College of To-Day".

Tiffany chaired the War Service Committee of the National American Woman Suffrage Association (NAWSA), and organized knitted donations for sailors, as chair of the 27th Assembly District's Navy Comforts Unit.

Tiffany served on the executive committees of the New York Infirmary for Women and Children and the Sunnyside Day Nursery. She spent a term as president of the Bryn Mawr College alumnae association, and of the Bryn Mawr Club of New York City.

== Personal life ==
Katrina Ely married Charles Louis Tiffany II (1878–1947), son of Louis Comfort Tiffany, in 1901. They lived in New York City, and summered in Oyster Bay Cove on Long Island. She died from pneumonia on March 11, 1927, aged 51 years, in New York City. Carrie Chapman Catt and Charles P. Howland spoke at memorial service for Tiffany in New York. "The life of Katrina Ely Tiffany was the best example I know of what a good citizen should be," Catt declared. "She left the world better than she found it." She left the bulk of her estate to her sisters and to the Bryn Mawr College alumnae association.
