= Committee for the Marshall Plan =

- Predecessor: Council on Foreign Relations, Brookings Institution (co-founders)
- Successor: George C. Marshall Foundation
- Formation: October 1947
- Founded at: 350 Fifth Avenue, New York NY 10118
- Purpose: Promote Marshall Plan
- Headquarters: 537 Fifth Avenue, New York NY 10017
- Fields: U.S. Foreign Policy
- Members: voluntary
- Henry L. Stimson: National Chairman
- Robert P. Patterson: Executive Chairman
- Hugh Moore: Treasurer
- John H. Ferguson: Executive Director
- Board of directors: Dean Acheson, Winthrop W. Aldrich, Frank Altschul, James B. Carey, David Dubinsky, Allen W. Dulles, Clark Eichelberger, William Emerson, Herbert Feis, Alger Hiss, Herbert H. Lehman, Frederick C. McKee, Arthur W. Page, Philip D. Reed, Herbert Bayard Swope, Mrs. Wendell Willkie

The Committee for the Marshall Plan, also known as Citizens' Committee for the Marshall Plan to Aid European Recovery, was a short-term organization established to promote passage of the European Recovery Program known as the Marshall Plan – which "fronted for a State Department legally barred from engaging in propaganda."

The committee disbanded not long after April 3, 1948, when U.S. President Harry S. Truman signed the Marshall Plan into law, which granted $5 billion in aid to 16 European nations.

== Opposition to the Marshall Plan ==
Postwar anti-Communism, pullback to American isolationism, and general conservative backlash led U.S. Republican Party politicians like U.S. Representatives Howard Buffett of Nebraska and Fred Busby of Illinois to oppose the Marshall Plan, which Buffett called "Operation Rathole".

== History ==
The Citizens' Committee for the Marshall Plan to Aid European Recovery formed in late October 1947. Its leaders were prominent liberal Eastern internationalists, members of the Council on Foreign Relations and Brookings Institution, a balance of bipartisan politicians, and labor leaders. Major donors included John D. Rockefeller.

Awareness of the Marshall Plan was already rising from July to December 1947, but the committee felt the need to propagandize.

To sway public opinion, the committee advertised, issued various documents (press releases, editorials, policy papers), sponsored radio broadcasts, hired speakers bureaus. Targets included women's clubs, church councils, and public affairs groups. Dean Acheson went on his own speaking tour, which included Palo Alto, Portland, Spokane, Minneapolis, and Duluth. Message focused on American idealism, self-interest, and ideology–particularly, humanitarian and economic concerns. Legislative efforts included an interim aid bill. In January 1948, debate and hearings geared up and ran through June 1948. The Harriman Committee made a report, and the committee sent private organizations as witnesses, of which 26 members were committee members themselves. The Communist takeover of Czechoslovakia worked in the committee's favor, but it did not adopt a strong "bulwark against Communism" position but rather avoided the topic of Communism.

On November 16, 1947, Alger Hiss published an essay that appeared on four pages of The New York Times Sunday Magazine, entitled "The Basic Question in The Great Debate." One of its five arguments was to answer the question "Why should we support socialist governments?" He summarized by writing, "Essentially the answer to this fifth question lies in the fact that the freely chosen governments of western Europe are the governments with which we must deal if we are to prevent economic chaos. We have no alternative." He also argued, "No country of Western Europe is at present fully socialistic or even 50 per cent socialistic in its control of economic life."

Passage by the House and Senate of the Foreign Assistance Act (HR 329–74, SR 69–17) helped.

After cartoonist Munro Leaf volunteered his skills to the State Department's Office of Public Affairs, he wrote a book published by the Committee for the Marshall Plan in 1947, titled Who Is the Man Against the Marshall Plan?, a Bibliography of Basic Official Documents.

== Organization ==
The committee's headquarters was in the Empire State Building, 350 Fifth Avenue, New York, New York, 10118, then 537 Fifth Avenue, New York, 10017, with offices in Washington, D.C., and regional or local chapters (e.g., Baltimore, Philadelphia).

Of the committee's executive board members, eight served on the Council on Foreign Relations, of which another two were members of the BAC, CED, or NPA – Allen Dulles (Council on Foreign Relations) and Philip Reed (Chairman of General Electric).

The national chairman was Henry L. Stimson and the executive director was John H. Ferguson. On April 2, 1948, the day before Truman signed the Marshall Plan into law, the members of the Executive Committee were:

- Robert P. Patterson, chair
- Hugh Moore, Treasurer
- Dean Acheson
- Winthrop W. Aldrich
- Frank Altschul
- James B. Carey
- David Dubinsky
- Allen Dulles, president of the Council on Foreign Relations
- Clark Eichelberger
- William Emerson
- Herbert Feis
- Alger Hiss, president of the Carnegie Endowment for International Peace
- Herbert H. Lehman
- Frederick C. McKee, Pittsburgh manufacturer and philanthropist
- Arthur W. Page
- Philip D. Reed, chairman of General Electric
- Herbert Bayard Swope
- Mrs. Wendell Willkie

Other members included Robert Gordon Sproul and Katharine Marston Seabury, chair of the "women's division."

== Legacy ==
Historian Michael Wala wrote, "The Citizens' Committee for the Marshall Plan to Aid European Recovery's work was crucial in passing the Marshall Plan."

== See also ==
- Marshall Plan
- Robert P. Patterson
- Alger Hiss
