= Croswell Bowen =

- Croswell Bowen
- Born: February 12, 1905; Toledo, Ohio
- Died: July 15, 1971 (aged 66); New York City
- Occupations: Writer; political reporter; activist; journalist; biographer
- Spouse: Marjory Hill Bowen
- Children: 3

Croswell Bowen (1905–1971) was an American political reporter, activist journalist, and biographer who contributed extensively to newspapers and magazines in the 1940s and 1950s.

He received a Benjamin Franklin Citation for his investigative report on low-level radiation risks, titled "The New Invisible Death Around Us." As a biographer, his Curse of the Misbegotten, a finalist for the National Book Award, was the first full-length biography of Nobel Prize-winning dramatist Eugene O'Neill. Born in Toledo, Ohio, he was educated at the Choate School, Yale University, the Sorbonne, and the New School for Social Research.

== Early career ==
Bowen gained early recognition as a reporter, known as the "Rover Boy of Park Row." He was often seen descending the stairs of the World Building with a press card in the brim of his fedora, breaking through police barriers calling out “I’m Bowen of the INS!" In Washington, D.C., as an International News Service reporter, Bowen covered high-level government press conferences, where the atmosphere was more gentlemanly. Reporters carried walking sticks and submitted written questions in advance. Ignoring that custom, he directly questioned Secretary of State Stimson on the Mukden incident, leading to the end of his connection with the INS.

Returned to New York's Greenwich Village, Bowen joined the company of the writers, artists and editors who gathered at the evening salon of best-selling popular historian Carl Carmer. Bowen's essay “I Was a Rich Man’s Son” appeared in a 1935 collection, the Forum and Century.

Having studied photography with Berenice Abbott at the New School, Bowen's opportunity to combine photography and writing came when Carl Carmer hired him to research the lives and lore of Hudson River folk for a volume in The Rivers of America series edited by Constance Lindsay Skinner. A prose/photography book of Bowen's own followed, The Hudson: Great River of the Mountains published in 1940, its text and pictures showing the influence of the Federal Writers' Project version of American literary regionalism. When Life commissioned Margaret Bourke-White to photograph the Hudson, Bowen and Carmer went with her as guides.

In 1941, he joined the American Field Service as an official photographer, was wounded during the Battle of Tobruk in 1942, and received the Africa Star and the British Empire Medal. Back From Tobruk, his account of that experience, was published in 2012.

Returned to wartime New York City, Bowen gave speeches for the Victory Speakers’ Bureau under the Office of War Information and held a desk job at CBS, monitoring and writing the foreign news, but resigned when CBS overrode his protests and reported the dispatches of a known propaganda source as legitimate. For a proposed book, Bowen interviewed and corresponded with Supreme Court Justice Felix Frankfurter, whose ideas about the role of the press in democracy inspired his subsequent career.

In 1943, he joined the staff of PM Magazine, a New York tabloid renowned among journalists for its policy against running advertising. PM staffers held a broad range of political viewpoints, including avowed Communists, although its editorials were generally left-liberal. Editors granted reporters and photographers unusually free rein in their work. Beginning as local news reporter and rising to associate editor, Bowen produced political reporting on various subjects, including press freedom at William and Mary, the press buildup of Von Hayek, the formation of the United Nations, domestic fascism, and figures such as George C. Marshall and J. Parnell Thomas at the trial of the Hollywood Ten. His work continued until the paper folded in 1948.

By then married and a father, Bowen moved to William Shawn’s New Yorker as a staff writer, where he wrote pieces for “Reporter at Large” and profiled criminals for “Annals of Crime.” Turning on the accused the same psychological attention he'd given to the powerful and famous, the profiles were published in 1954 as They Went Wrong.

When Tammany politics surfaced again in mid-1950s New York, a Shawn assignment to write a piece on 19th Century Tammany Mayor A. Oakey Hall led to a year-long immersion in the New York Public Library and a third book, his first biography, The Elegant Oakey.

== McCarthy era ==
The McCarthyism of the early 1950s was an uneasy time for Eastern liberals like Bowen, as they watched the reputations of many acquaintances—such as Lillian Hellman and Dashiell Hammett—challenged by the Hollywood blacklist of the House Un-American Activities Committee. When the televised Army-McCarthy Hearings diminished Joseph McCarthy's influence, Bowen sought to expose the Federal Bureau of Investigation's investigations of "subversives and radicals." He devised a plan to gain access through the F.B.I. for a New Yorker-style profile on its director, J. Edgar Hoover. Unaware that records accessed under the Freedom of Information Act revealed his affiliation with PM had long made him a suspect and that his New Yorker crime pieces marked him as “not a friend of law enforcement,” he did not realize how unlikely it was that he would gain their trust. Access was handily refused.

== Later career ==
Since his 1947 piece in PM magazine on Eugene O’Neill, “The Black Irishman,” Bowen had continued to explore how the playwright's troubled life influenced his work. As O’Neill's reputation revived with the production of his masterpiece, Long Day’s Journey into Night, Bowen contracted to write a book-length biography. The Curse of the Misbegotten: A Tale of the House of O’Neill became a National Book Award finalist.

Throughout the 1950s and beyond, Bowen continued to publish on topics he believed in, including the manipulative world of public relations, consumer psychology-based marketing techniques, the justifications used by Madison Avenue to continue advertising cigarettes, and the tragedy of the first smog outbreak in Donora, Pennsylvania.

He began writing a biography of John F. Kennedy and a semi-autobiographical novel, both of which remained unfinished.

== Death ==
Croswell Bowen died on July 15, 1971, in his New York City apartment of a fourth heart attack. He was survived by his former wife Marjory Hill Bowen and three daughters, Betsy, Lucey and Molly. His papers are housed in the Beinecke Library at Yale and the Andrew Mellon Library, Choate-Rosemary Hall.

== Bibliography ==
Books

- Great River of the Mountains: The Hudson. New York: Hastings House, 1941.
- They Went Wrong. New York: McGraw-Hill, 1954.
- The Elegant Oakey. New York: Oxford University Press, 1956.
- The Curse of the Misbegotten: A Tale of the House of O'Neill. New York: McGraw-Hill, 1959.
- Back From Tobruk. Washington, D.C.: Potomac Books, 2013.
