= Division of Special Research =

The Division of Special Research was a subdivision of the U.S. State Department charged with preparing studies in the field of problems post World War II. The department was secretly established February 3, 1941, subsequent to FDR's Four Freedoms speech, before the United States' involvement in the war, and existed until January 1, 1943, when it was replaced by a Division of Political Studies and a Division of Economic Studies. Leo Pasvolsky was chief of the division and its successors. Harley Notter, Charles W. Yost and H. Julian Wadleigh were assigned by Hull to assist Pasvolsky. During 1942, diplomat Charles W. Yost served as Assistant Chief. From February 1942, Pasvolsky served also as Executive Officer of the Advisory Committee on Postwar Foreign Policy.

Beginning in 1942, one aspect of the Division's work involved keeping a record of all official commitments or statements regarding the postwar settlement issued by Allied or neutral governments, whether made publicly or confidentially. This function was performed initially by the Commitments Unit under Virginia Fox Hartley.
