= Gertrude Sumner Ely =

American philanthropist

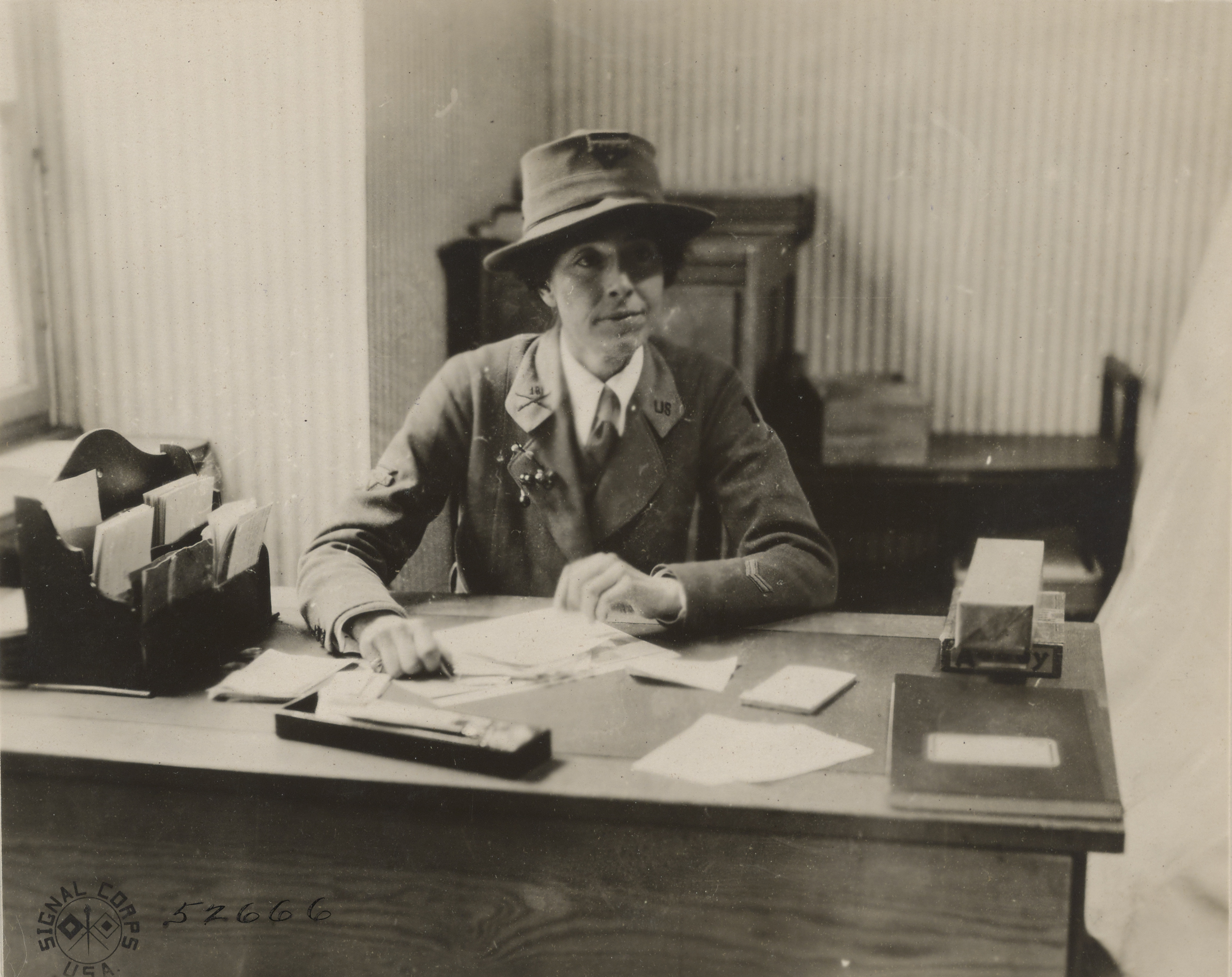
- Coblenz, January 30, 1919
- Born: September 20, 1876; Altoona, Pennsylvania
- Died: October 15, 1970 (aged 94); Bryn Mawr, Pennsylvania
- Years active: 1890s-1960s
- Parent: Theodore N. Ely
- Awards: Croix de Guerre

Gertrude Sumner Ely (September 20, 1876 – October 15, 1970) was an American philanthropist, based in Philadelphia. She was decorated for her bravery during World War I.

== Early life ==
Gertrude Sumner Ely was born September 20, 1876, in Altoona, Pennsylvania, the second daughter of Theodore Newell Ely (1846–1916) and Henrietta Van Sidden Brandes Ely. Her father was a railroad executive, as vice president of the Pennsylvania Railroad; he was also director of the Pennsylvania Academy of the Fine Arts. Her mother died in 1880; her stepmother, Susanna Wierman, died in 1904. Her older sister Katrina Ely Tiffany (1875–1927) and her younger sister Henrietta Brandes Ely were also active in suffrage and war work. Gertrude Ely graduated from The Baldwin School in 1895 and from Bryn Mawr College in 1899.

== Career ==
=== World War I ===
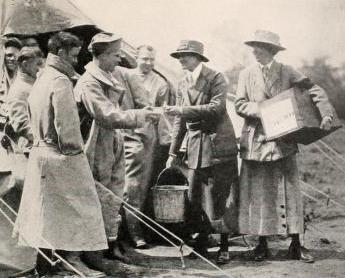
Mary Noel Arrowsmith and Gertrude Sumner Ely at Field Hospital No. 3., Froissy, May 7, 1918.

During World War I Ely and her sister Henrietta worked with the YMCA and the American Red Cross in France, with Gertrude Ely operating a canteen near the front. Her work was explained in Katherine Mayo's 1920 account of the YMCA's contributions in the war:

Gertrude Ely had a flivver, lucky woman. Into that flivver, on the word to move, she packed a lot of rations, a cook-stove, a boiler, chocolate, a fiddle, some maps, a Y red triangle sign, writing paper, pens, ink, candles, her own bedroll, a lot of useful odds and ends, and all the cigarettes that room remained for. Then she started out a little ahead of the column.

She was believed to be the first American woman to cross the Rhine into Germany after the signing of the armistice. She received the Croix de Guerre, twice, for bravery under fire. Ely was captain of a women's baseball team that played US army units in occupied Germany in 1919. She shared a place of honor in a 1919 parade in New York, with fellow YMCA war workers Mary Noel Arrowsmith, Frances Gulick, Ethel Creighton Torrance, and Marjorie Skelding.

=== Philadelphia ===
Ely was active in many feminist and cultural organizations; her associates included President William H. Taft, Jane Addams, journalist Dorothy Thompson, Albert Einstein, and First Lady Eleanor Roosevelt. She was president of the Junior League of Philadelphia from 1915 to 1917. She was head of the Pennsylvania chapter of the League of Women Voters, and served on the League's national board. She was Pennsylvania director of women's projects for the Works Progress Administration.

She spent a summer in Tesuque, New Mexico, living in an adobe house with her Bryn Mawr friend Elizabeth Shepley Sergeant, who later described their adventure in a serial for Harper's Magazine, titled The Journal of a Mud House.

Ely was a delegate to the 1928 Democratic National Convention. In 1934 she ran for the Pennsylvania state senate. In the 1950s she took an interest in legal representation for Native American tribes; she served a term on the board of the National Association of American Indian Affairs. At the beginning of World War II, she served refreshments to the recruits at Camp Blanding in Florida, and wrote to her friend Eleanor Roosevelt about the plight of German Jewish families.

Ely served on the executive committee of UNICEF, and in 1967 hosted UNICEF's "Trick of Treat" at her home, Wyndham Barn, welcoming Halloween visitors collecting donations for the project. She was a patron of the Philadelphia Orchestra and the Bryn Mawr Hospital. She received the first annual Baldwin School Alumnae Award in 1967. In 1968 she was named a Distinguished Daughter of Pennsylvania.

== Personal life ==
Gertrude Sumner Ely died in Bryn Mawr, Pennsylvania, on October 15, 1970, aged 94 years. Bryn Mawr College named a fellowship for Ely. She donated her family's photo album to Bryn Mawr.
