= Norman Davis (diplomat) =

American diplomat (1878–1944)

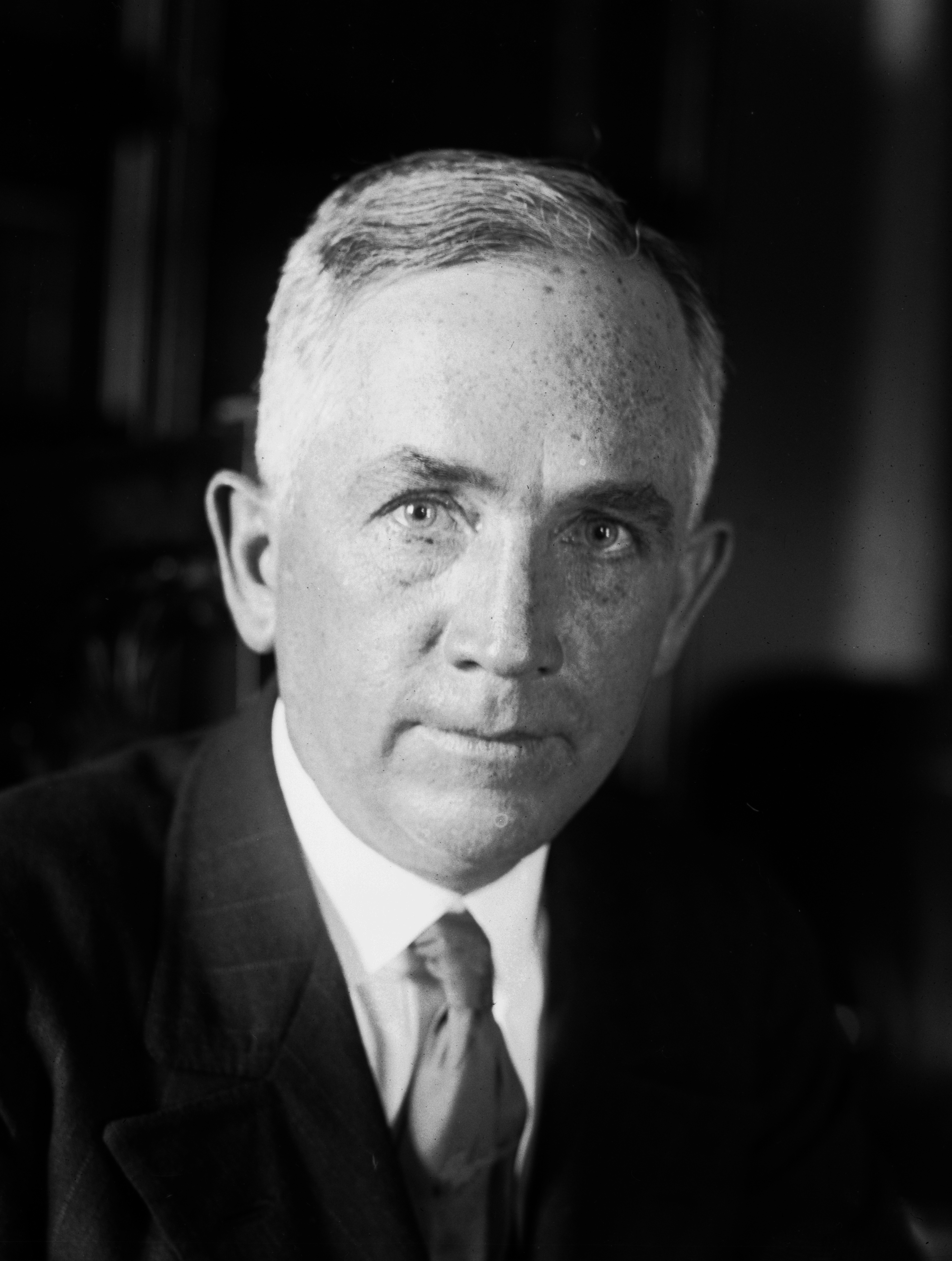
- Davis in 1920

2nd United States Under Secretary of State
- In office June 15, 1920 – March 7, 1921
- President: Woodrow Wilson; Warren G. Harding
- Preceded by: Frank Polk
- Succeeded by: Henry P. Fletcher

Personal details
- Born: Norman Hezekiah Davis; August 9, 1878 Normandy, Tennessee, U.S.
- Died: July 2, 1944 (aged 65) Hot Springs, Virginia, U.S.
- Spouse: Mackie Paschall (m. 1898; died 1942)
- Children: 8
- Education: Vanderbilt University; Stanford University

Norman Hezekiah Davis (August 9, 1878 – July 2, 1944) was a U.S. diplomat. He joined the Treasury Department in 1917, serving as President Wilson's chief financial advisor at the Paris Peace Conference. In 1919 he was appointed Assistant Secretary of the Treasury, and the following year became Under Secretary of State.

== Biography ==
He was born in Normandy, Bedford County, Tennessee to successful businessman and distiller McClin H. Davis, who is credited with perfecting the recipe for Cascade Whisky, which is now known as George Dickel. Davis was prepared at the prestigious Webb School in Bell Buckle, TN, and studied at both Stanford and Vanderbilt. Davis briefly ran the Cascade Distillery following his father's death in 1898, but was forced to sell his share of the distillery to the operation's majority owners.

Norman Davis made millions of dollars from his financial dealings in Cuba from 1902 to 1917, first in partnership with Tillinghast L'Hommedieu Huston, and then as the president of the Trust Company of Cuba. While working in the financial industry, he built close friendships with Henry Pomeroy Davison, an influential partner with J.P. Morgan & Co. and Chairman of the American Red Cross, and Richard M. Bissell, president of Hartford Fire Insurance and a member of the National Defense Commission. Through these connections, he was appointed as a financial adviser to the Secretary of Treasury on foreign loans during World War I.

As a diplomat, Norman Davis headed a commission of the League of Nations that negotiated the Klaipėda Convention in 1924. The League of Nations was the predecessor of the United Nations.

Ms. Elizabeth Ham worked in the secretariat with diplomat Norman Davis around that time. In January 1971, Ms. Ham had the honor of naming the thoroughbred horse called Big Red, after her former workplace, Secretariat. Secretariat set many records on his way to winning the Triple Crown in 1973.

He was a delegate to the first General Conference for the Limitation and Reduction of Armaments at Geneva that opened in February, 1932. Shortly after the Disarmament Conference resumed in the spring of 1933, he arrived in Geneva, and began serving as chairman of the American delegation with the rank of ambassador, having been appointed to that position by the incoming Roosevelt administration.

In a May 22, 1933 address to the Disarmament Conference at Geneva Davis said, "We feel the ultimate objective should be to reduce armaments... through successive stages down to the level of a domestic police force."

In 1938, Norman H. Davis, then recently appointed Chairman of the American Red Cross by President Franklin D. Roosevelt, was also elected Chairman of the Board of Governors of the League of Red Cross Societies (now the International Federation of Red Cross and Red Crescent Societies), succeeding Admiral Cary T. Grayson. Davis served as Chairman until his death in July 1944. He was succeeded by Dr. Jean De Muralt.

He also served as president of the Council on Foreign Relations 1936–1944 and was a member of the Peabody Awards Board of Jurors from 1940 to 1942.

In 1939, following the outbreak of war in Europe, Davis chaired the steering committee of the Council on Foreign Relations' War and Peace Studies project, created to advise the U.S. Government on wartime policy. He joined the State Department's committee on overseas war measures, the fifteen-member Advisory Committee on Problems of Foreign Relations. He died in 1944

Non-profit organization positions
| Preceded by Cary T. Grayson | Chairman of the International League of Red Cross Societies; 1938–1944 | Succeeded by Jean de Muralt |
