= Clark Eichelberger =

American peace activist

- Born: Clark Mell Eichelberger; 1896; Freeport, Illinois
- Died: 1980 (aged 83–84)
- Education: Northwestern University
- Occupation: Peace activist
- Years active: 1922–1977
- Employer(s): LNA, AAUN, UNAUSA, COSP

Clark Mell Eichelberger (1896–1980) was a 20th-century American peace activist who championed first the League of Nations and then its successor, the United Nations.

== Background ==
Eichelberger was born in 1896 in Freeport, Illinois. His parents were Joseph Elmer Eichelberger and Olive Clark. They descended from pre-revolutionary Swiss and English settlers. He interrupted and never resumed his studies at Northwestern University.

== Career ==
In World War I, Eichelberger interrupted his studies to serve in France.

In 1922, he became a lecturer for the Radcliffe Chautauqua System.

In 1928, Eichelberger became director of the Midwest office of the League of Nations Association (LNA). He served as a consultant to the League of Nations Secretariat. By 1934, he was the national director of the League of Nations Association. In 1945, the association's name changed to the American Association of the United Nations (AAUN), and Eichelberger served as its executive director until 1964, when he became vice president of the United Nations Association of the USA (UNAUSA) through 1968.

In 1945, Eichelberger served as consultant to the United States delegation to the San Francisco Conference and was a member of the committee that created the first draft of the UN Charter. Alger Hiss served as acting secretary during that meeting.

In 1939, he co-founded and directed the Commission to Study the Organization of Peace (CSOP). In 1964, he became its chairman. In 1968, he became executive director and served 1974.

Eichelberger was a prolific writer and used such occasions to advocated for the United Nations as a means of achieving world peace. In 1939, he wrote:

The road to peace for the United States and for the rest of the nations is to be found in a highly developed society of nations. Some future generation may live in a world in which national sovereignty counts for much less than it does today. In it there will be new forms of group loyalty and patriotism.

In 1944, in a review on book about the United Nations, he commented:

The world has so shrunk that the distance from Washington to any other place in the world is less in time than the distance from Washington to New York in the early history of our country. In this kind of a world there is not room for several sets of moralities and rules of international conduct. Above and beyond any natural groupings must be universal law, and a common morality, and a universal organization.

In 1955, Eichelberger was advocating for the United Nations and the peacemaking role of its General Assembly.

Eichelberger was also associated with the World Federation of United Nations Associations, the Committee to Defend America by Aiding the Allies, Citizens for Victory, the Non-Partisan Committee for Peace through Revision of the Neutrality Law, Free World Association, the Committee for Concerted Peace Efforts, and Americans United for World Organization.

In 1947 to 1948, he was also a member of the executive board of the Committee for the Marshall Plan.

Eichelberger died in 1980.

== Works ==
Eichelberger wrote many books on the United Nations.

- Peaceful change, the alternative to war; a survey prepared for the National Peace Conference Campaign for World Economic Cooperation with William T. Stone (New York: Foreign Policy Association, c1937)
- Proposals for the United Nations charter; what was done at Dumbarton Oaks (New York: Commission to Study the Organization of Peace, 1944)
- Time has come for action (New York: Commission to study the organization of peace, 1944)
- United nations charter; what was done at San Francisco (New York: American association for the United Nations, 1945)
- UN: the first ten years (New York: Harper, 1955)
- UN: the first fifteen years (New York: Harper, 1960)
- UN: the first twenty years (New York: Harper & Row, 1965)
- UN: The first twenty-five years (New York, Harper & Row, 1970)
- Organizing for peace : a personal history of the founding of the United Nations (New York: Harper & Row, c1977)

== External sources ==
- UNAUSA: About Us (Eichelberger mentioned)
- Kansas Historical Society: Telegram from Eichelberger to Gov. Payne Ratner (August 14, 1940)
- Truman Library: Correspondence Truman and Eichelberger (November 29, 1945)
- Truman Library: Correspondence Truman and Eichelberger (May 15, 194)
- Clark M. Eichelberger's papers are housed at University of Iowa Libraries Special Collections & Archives.
