= Declaration of war on Germany =

Multiple countries declared war on Germany over time, including:

== World War I ==
- Chinese declaration of war on Germany (1917), which became a fierce struggle in the National Assembly, 14 August 1917
- French declaration of war on Germany (1914), 3 August 1914
- Russian declaration of war on Germany (1914), 7 August 1914
- United Kingdom declaration of war on Germany (1914), automatically including all dominions, colonies, etc. of the British Empire including Canada, Australia, and British India, 4 August 1914
- United States declaration of war on Germany (1917), 6 April 1917

== World War II ==
- Canadian declaration of war on Germany, 10 September 1939
- French declaration of war on Germany (1939), 3 September 1939
- United Kingdom declaration of war on Germany (1939), 3 September 1939
- United States declaration of war on Germany (1941), 11 December 1941
- Turkish declaration of war on Germany and Japan, 23 February 1945

== See also ==
- German declaration of war against the United States
