= Timeline of the history of the United States (1930–1949) =

This section of the timeline of United States history concerns events from 1930 to 1949.

== 1930s ==
=== Presidency of Herbert C. Hoover ===
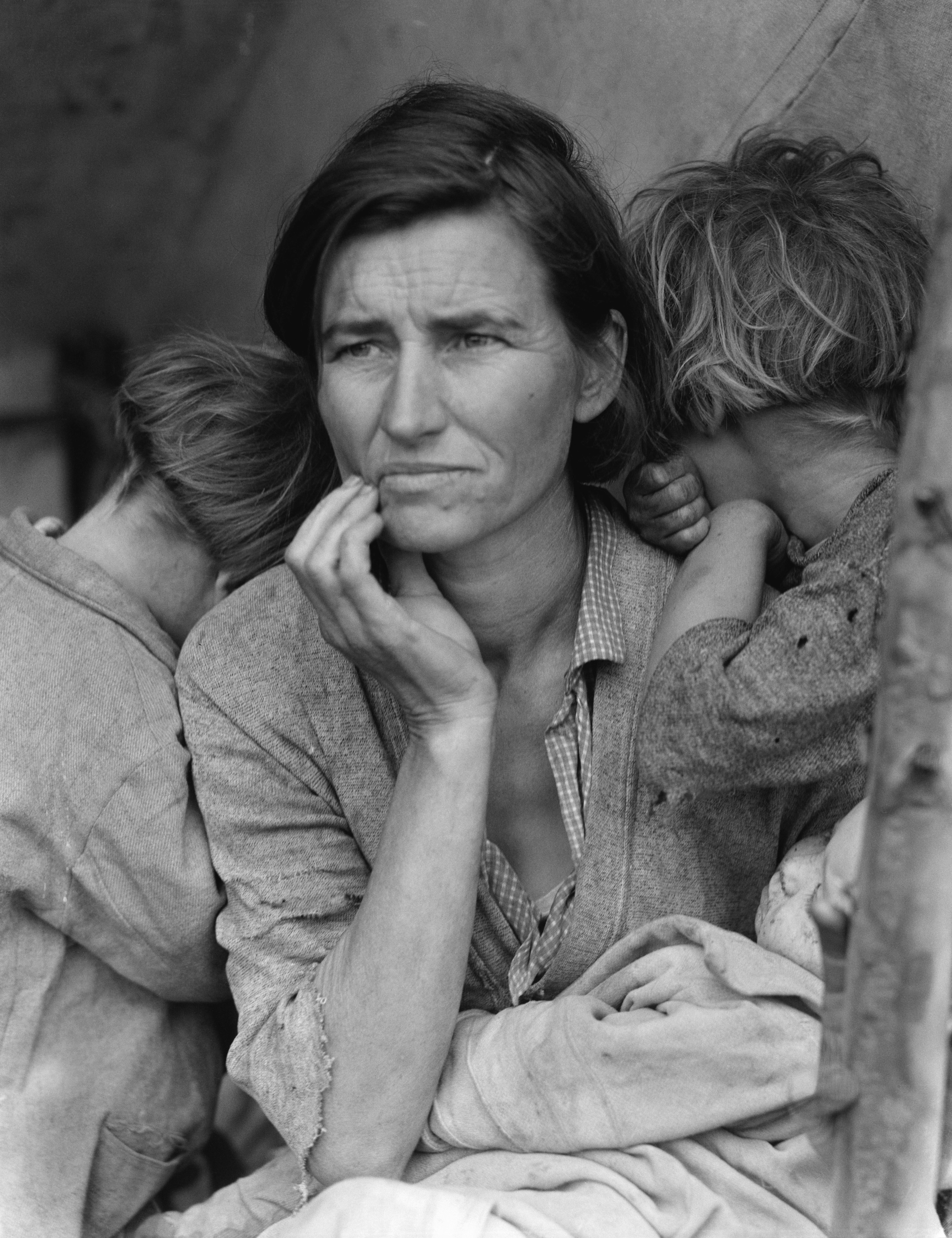
Dorothea Lange's Migrant Mother, an iconic image of the Great Depression in the United States

- 1930 – The Great Depression in the United States continues to worsen, reaching a nadir in early 1933.
- 1930 – The Motion Picture Production Code becomes set of industry censorship guidelines governing production of the vast majority of United States motion pictures released by major studios; is effective for 38 years
- 1930 – Frozen vegetables, packaged by Clarence Birdseye, become the first frozen food to go on sale
- 1930 – The Democrats take Congress in the Midterms. Will keep it until 1946.
- 1930 - Hawley-Smoot Tariff
- 1930 - Clyde Tombaugh discovers Pluto
- 1930 - Sinclair Lewis is the first American to win Nobel Prize for Literature
- 1931 – Empire State Building opens in New York.
- 1931 – Japanese invasion of Manchuria, start of World War II in the Pacific.
- 1931 – The Whitney Museum of American Art opens to the public in New York City.
- 1931 - “The Star-Spangled Banner” becomes official U.S. national anthem
- 1931 - Hoover vetoes Veteran Bonus
- 1931 - Pearl Buck publishes The Good Earth making heroes of the Chinese peasants
- 1932 – Stimson Doctrine opposes Japanese expansion into Manchuria
- 1932 – Norris-La Guardia Act strengthens labor unions
- 1932 - Baby son of Charles Lindbergh was kidnapped and found dead
- 1932 – Bonus Army marches on DC; repressed by President Hoover
- 1932 – Reconstruction Finance Corporation finances relief
- 1932 – 1932 United States presidential election: Franklin D. Roosevelt elected president, John Nance Garner elected vice president
- 1933 – Chicago Mayor Anton Cermak killed during a failed assassination attempt on President-elect Roosevelt by Giuseppe Zangara; the intended target was not wounded.
- 1933 - Over 12 million or 25% of Americans were unemployed
- 1933 – 20th Amendment, establishing the beginning and ending of the terms of the elected federal offices.

=== Presidency of Franklin D. Roosevelt ===
- March 4, 1933 – Roosevelt becomes the 32nd president. He is the last president to be inaugurated on March 4. It also began his "Hundred Days". Garner becomes the 32nd vice president. He is the last vice president to be inaugurated on March 4.
- 1933 – President Roosevelt establishes the New Deal, a response to the Great Depression, and focusing on what historians call the "3 Rs": relief, recovery and reform
- 1933 - Emergency Banking Act
- 1933 – Sweeping new programs proposed under President Roosevelt take effect: the Agricultural Adjustment Act, Civil Works Administration, Civilian Conservation Corps, Farm Credit Administration the Home Owners' Loan Corporation, the Tennessee Valley Authority, the Public Works Administration, the National Industrial Recovery Act
- 1933 - San Francisco Ballet founded
- 1933 – Frances Perkins appointed United States Secretary of Labor
- 1933 – 21st Amendment, ending Prohibition
- 1933 - United States government recognizes the Soviet Union
- 1934 – Glass–Steagall Act
- 1934 – U.S. Securities and Exchange Commission established
- 1934 – Dust Bowl begins, causing major ecological and agricultural damage to the Great Plains states; severe drought, heat waves and other factors were contributors.
- 1934 – Federal Housing Administration
- 1934 – Johnson Act
- 1934 - Indian Reorganization Act
- 1934 – Philippine Commonwealth established
- 1934 – Reciprocal Trade Agreements Act
- 1934 – Tydings–McDuffie Act
- 1934 – John Dillinger killed
- 1934 – Share the Wealth society founded by Huey Long
- 1934 - The first federal prisoners arrived at Alcatraz
- 1935 – Works Progress Administration
- 1935 – The F.B.I. is established with J. Edgar Hoover as its first director.
- 1935 – Neutrality Act
- 1935 – Motor Carrier Act
- 1935 – Social Security Act
- 1935 – Schechter Poultry Corp. v. United States
- 1935 – National Labor Relations Act
- 1935 – Huey Long assassinated
- 1935 – Congress of Industrial Organizations formed
- 1935 – Alcoholics Anonymous founded
- 1935 – Revenue Act of 1935
- 1935 - Middletown is published
- 1936 – Robinson-Patman Act
- 1936 - Hoover Dam
- 1936 – Life magazine publishes first issue
- 1936 – United States v. Butler, which ruled that the processing taxes instituted under the 1933 Agricultural Adjustment Act were unconstitutional
- 1936 – Second London Naval Treaty
- 1936 - Jesse Owens won 4 gold medals at the Olympics in Berlin, Germany
- 1936 – 1936 United States presidential election: Franklin D. Roosevelt reelected president, John Nance Garner reelected vice president
- 1936 - 1936 Tupelo–Gainesville tornado outbreak
- 1936 - Babe Ruth and Ty Cobb named to baseball's Hall of Fame
- 1937 – Look magazine publishes first issue
- 1937 – Neutrality Acts
- January 20, 1937 – President Roosevelt and Vice President Garner begin second terms.
- 1937 – Hindenburg disaster, killing 35 people and marking an end to airship travel
- 1937 – Panay incident, a Japanese attack on the United States Navy gunboat USS Panay while anchored in the Yangtze River outside of Nanjing
- 1937 – Golden Gate Bridge completed in San Francisco
- 1938 – Wheeler-Lea Act
- 1938 – Fair Labor Standards Act
- 1938 - Thornton Wilder’s play Our Town wins Pulitzer Prize
- 1938 - The comic book superhero Superman debuts in Action Comics #1 (June 1938)
- 1938 – Orson Welles' The War of the Worlds broadcast
- 1939 – Hatch Act, aimed at corrupt political practices and prevented federal civil servants from campaigning
- 1939 – Nazi Germany invades Poland; World War II begins
- 1939 – Cash and carry proposed to replace the Neutrality Acts
- 1939 – President Roosevelt, appearing at the opening of the 1939 New York World's Fair, becomes the first president to give a speech that is broadcast on television. Semi-regular broadcasts air during the next two years

== 1940s ==
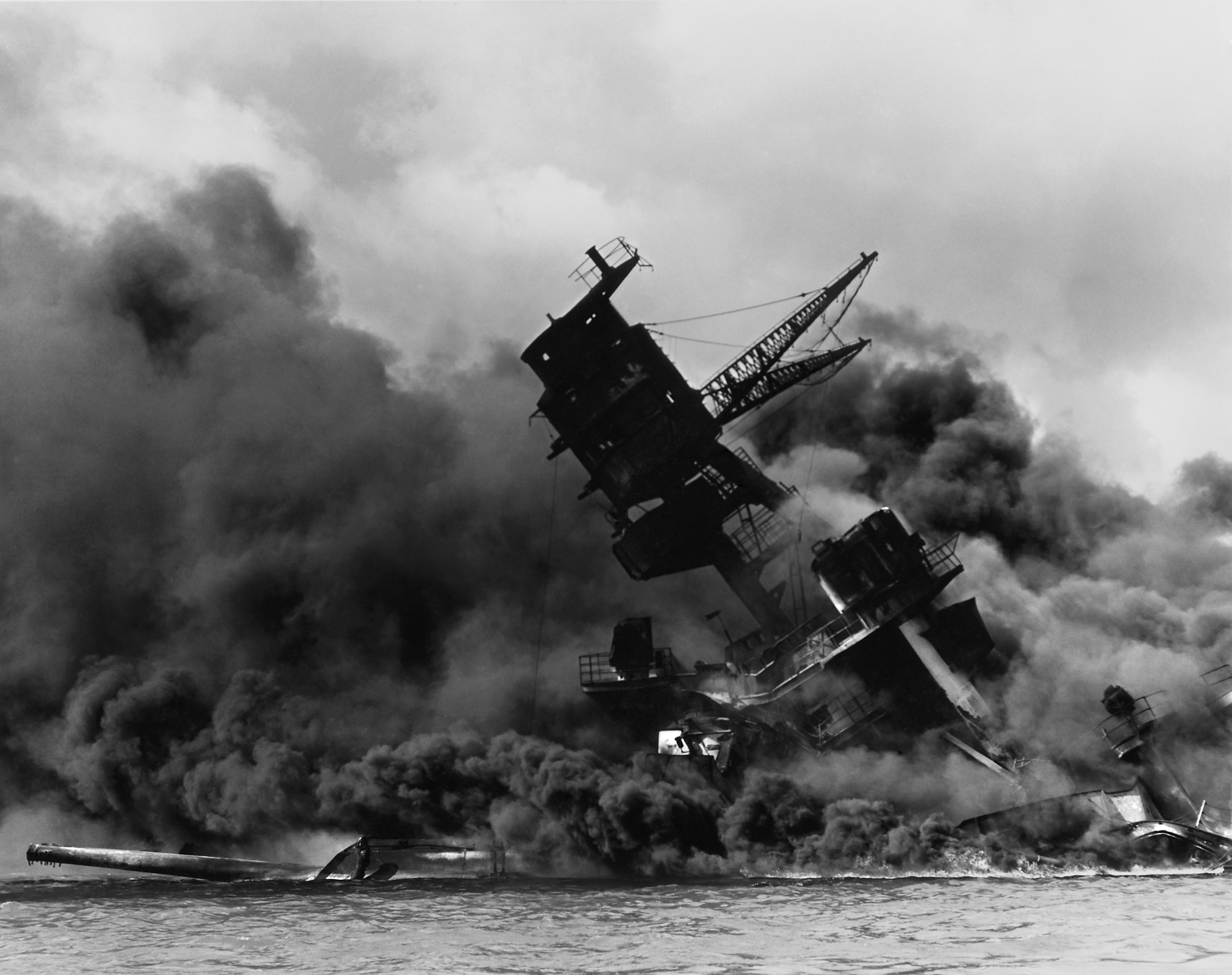
The USS Arizona, aflame and sinking, on December 7, 1941

- 1940 – Selective Service Act, establishing the first peacetime draft in U.S. history
- 1940 – Alien Registration (Smith) Act
- 1940 – Oldsmobile becomes the first car maker to offer a fully automatic transmission
- 1940 – Bugs Bunny, Tom and Jerry and Woody Woodpecker make their cartoon debuts
- 1940 – Billboard magazine publishes its first music popularity chart, the predecessor to today's Hot 100
- 1940 – 1940 United States presidential election: Franklin D. Roosevelt is reelected president to a record third term, Henry A. Wallace is elected vice president
- 1940 - Color television is demonstrated by the Columbia Broadcasting System
- 1941 – Regular commercial television broadcasting begins; CBS and NBC television networks launched.
- January 20, 1941 – President Roosevelt begins third term; Wallace becomes the 33rd vice president
- March 1941 – Lend-Lease, which supplies the United Kingdom, the Soviet Union, China, France and other Allied nations with vast amounts of war material during World War II
- June 22, 1941 – Operation Barbarossa: Nazi Germany begins war against the Soviet Union
- August 1941 – Atlantic Charter, drafted by the UK and U.S., to serve as the blueprint for the postwar world after World War II
- December 7, 1941 – Attack on Pearl Harbor; U.S. enters World War II by declaring war on Japan the next day; and three days later against Germany and against Italy.
- 1942 – Japanese American internment, German American Internment, and Italian American Internment begin, per executive order by President Roosevelt; the order also authorizes the seizure of their property.
- 1942–1945 – Automobile production in the United States for private consumers halted.
- 1942 – Casablanca released
- 1942 - Sugar and gasoline are rationed
- March 1942 – Congress of Racial Equality founded
- 1942 – U.S.-controlled Commonwealth of the Philippines conquered by Japanese forces
- April 1942 – Doolittle Raid
- May 1942 – Battle of the Coral Sea
- June 1942 – Battle of Midway
- August 1942 – Guadalcanal campaign begins
- August 1942 – Office of Price Administration founded
- 1942 – Revenue Act of 1942
- November 1942 – Operation Torch
- 1942 – Cocoanut Grove fire kills 492 people, leads to vast reforms in fire codes and safety standards
- 1943 – Oklahoma! the first musical written by the team of composer Richard Rodgers and librettist Oscar Hammerstein II opens on Broadway
- 1943 – Detroit, Michigan race riots
- 1943 – Allied invasion of Sicily
- September 1943 – Allied invasion of Italy begins
- 1943 – Cairo Conference
- 1943 – Casablanca Conference
- 1943 – Tehran Conference (meeting between the leaders of USSR, UK, and US (Stalin, Churchill and Roosevelt) to discuss D-day)
- 1944 – Battle of Monte Cassino
- 1944 – Dumbarton Oaks Conference
- 1944 – G.I. Bill
- June 6, 1944 – D-Day. Operation Overlord begins.
- July 1944 – Bretton Woods Conference
- August 1944 - battle of the Falaise pocket. It opens the way to the Liberation of Paris and the Franco-German border
- 1944 – Battle of Peleliu
- 1944 – Battle of Leyte
- 1944 – 1944 United States presidential election: Franklin D. Roosevelt reelection for a fourth term, becomes the only U.S. president elected four times. Harry S. Truman is elected vice president
- December 1944 – the Wehrmacht begins the Battle of the Bulge
- January 20, 1945 – President Roosevelt begins fourth term; Truman becomes the 34th vice president
- February 1945 – Yalta Conference
- 1945 – Battle of Iwo Jima
- 1945 – Battle of Okinawa
- 1945 – due to inflation and working conditions, nationwide labor strikes begin.

=== Presidency of Harry S. Truman ===
- April 12, 1945 – President Roosevelt dies, Vice President Truman becomes the 33rd US president
- May 8, 1945 – Germany surrenders, end of World War II in Europe
- 1945 – Carousel opens on Broadway
- July 1945 – Potsdam Conference
- 1945 - Tennessee Williams’s play The Glass Menagerie opens in New York
- August 6 and 9, 1945 – Atomic bombings of Hiroshima and Nagasaki
- August 15, 1945 – Surrender of Japan (formally signed on 2 September 1945, ending the war)
- 1945 – United Nations Conference on International Organization; United Nations established
- June 1945 – United Nations Charter signed in San Francisco, establishing the United Nations; it replaces the League of Nations
- 1945–1949 – Nuremberg Trials and Subsequent Nuremberg Trials
- March 1946 – Churchill's Iron Curtain speech
- 1946 – Benjamin Spock's The Common Sense Book of Baby and Child Care published
- 1946 – Employment Act
- 1946 – United States Atomic Energy Act of 1946
- 1946 – President's Committee on Civil Rights
- 1946 – Philippines regain independence from the U.S.
- November 1946 – Republicans win the US House of Representatives elections for the first time in 16 years.
- March 1947 – Federal Employee Loyalty Program
- 1947 – Presidential Succession Act
- May 1947 - Office of Price Administration dissolved
- 1947 – Taft Hartley Act
- 1947 – U.F.O. crash at Roswell, New Mexico
- 1947 – National Security Act of 1947
- 1947 – General Agreement on Tariffs and Trade (GATT)
- 1947 – Marshall Plan drafted
- 1947 – Polaroid camera invented
- 1947 – Truman Doctrine establishes "the policy of the United States to support free peoples who are resisting attempted subjugation by armed minorities or by outside pressures"
- 1947 – Jackie Robinson breaks color barrier in baseball
- 1947 – Studebaker becomes the first automobile manufacturer to introduce a "post-war" model; most automakers wait until 1948 or 1949
- 1947 – Jackson Pollock begins painting his most famous series of paintings called the drip paintings in Easthampton, New York
- 1947 – First broadcast of Meet the Press
- 1947 - World Series is broadcast live on television for the first time
- 1948 – The Texaco Star Theater, starring Milton Berle, becomes the first major successful U.S. television program; The Toast of the Town also debuts
- 1948 – Berlin Blockade
- 1948 – 1948 United States presidential election: Harry S. Truman is elected president for a full term, Alben W. Barkley is elected vice president
- 1948 – Truman desegregates armed forces
- 1948 – Selective Service Act of 1948: Passed after first such act expired
- 1948 – Organization of American States: Alliance of North America and South America
- 1948 – Alger Hiss Case
- January 20, 1949 – President Truman begins full term, Barkley becomes the 35th vice president
- 1949 – North Atlantic Treaty Organization (NATO) formed
- 1949 - The first mammal, a rhesus monkey named Albert II, is launched into space in a suborbital flight
- 1949 – In China, Communists under Mao Zedong force Chiang Kai-shek's KMT government to retreat to Taiwan
- 1949 – Soviet Union tests its first atomic bomb
- 1949 – Department of War becomes the Department of the Army and becomes subordinate to the new Department of Defense
- 1949 – Germany divided into East and West
- 1949 – Truman attempts to continue FDR's legacy with his Fair Deal, but most acts don't pass

== See also ==
- Causes of the Great Depression
- Timeline of modern American conservatism
- History of the United States (1918–1945)
- History of the United States (1945–1964)
