= Italian declaration of war on the United States =

1941 act during World War II

Declaration of war on the United States
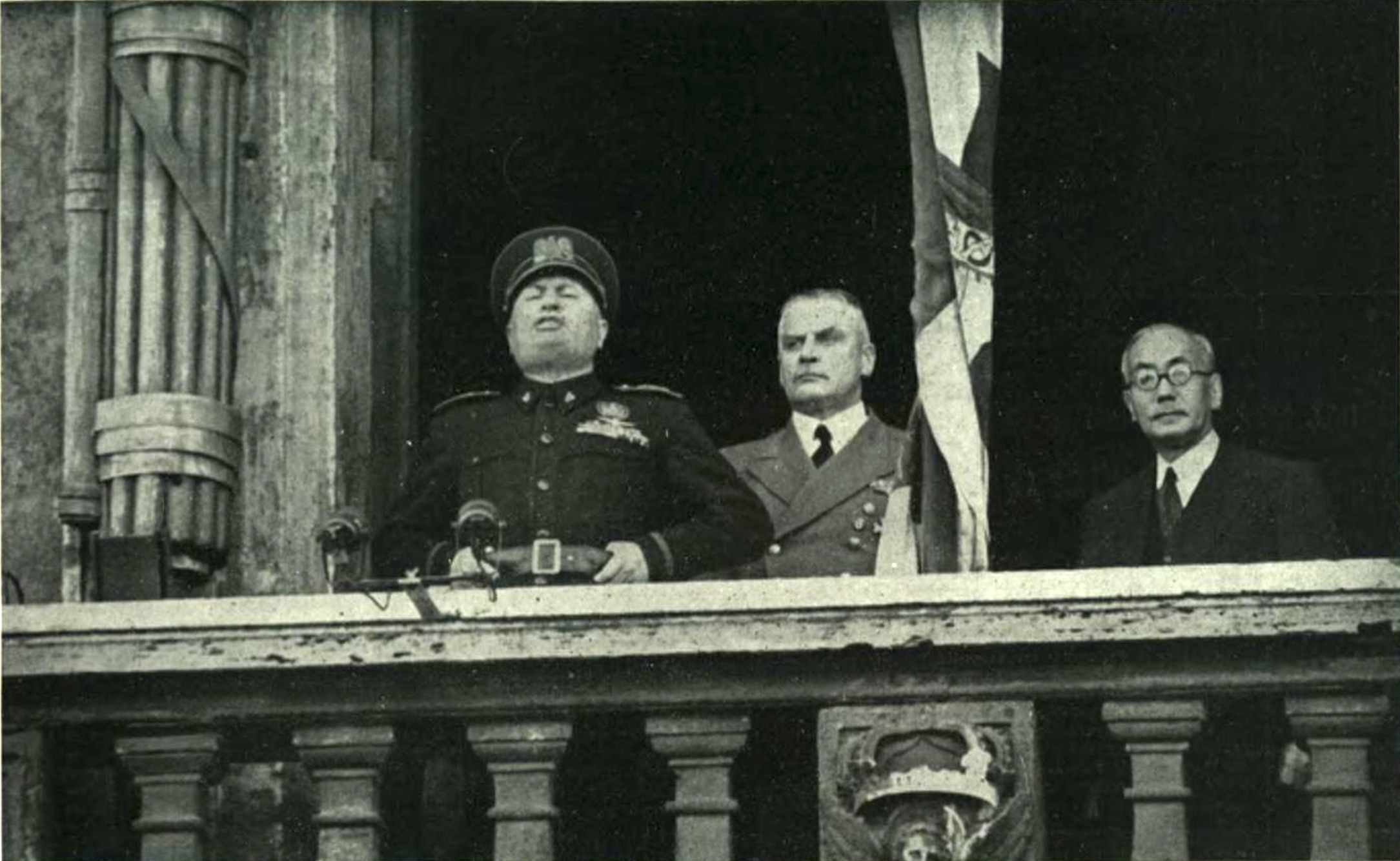
- Mussolini announces the declaration of war
- Presented: 11 December 1941; 84 years ago
- Location: Palazzo Venezia, Rome, Italy
- Author: Benito Mussolini
- Purpose: Declaring war on the United States so that "Fascist Italy and Nationalist Socialist Germany" would "participate from today on the side of...Japan"

Full text
- Italian declaration of war on the United States at Wikisource

On 11 December 1941, Italy declared war on the United States. The declaration followed the Japanese attack on Pearl Harbor four days earlier, and occurred several hours before Germany's declaration of war against the United States. Benito Mussolini publicly made the announcement in Rome on December 11. Shortly before Mussolini's speech, Italian Foreign Minister Galeazzo Ciano delivered the news to the head U.S. diplomat in Italy, George Wadsworth II.

The Italian, German, and Japanese governments had signed the Tripartite Pact in 1940, formally allying the three powers with one another. Italy and Germany also signed the Pact of Steel military alliance in 1939. Italy had declared war on the United Kingdom and France on 10 June 1940, as Mussolini implemented the Pact of Steel and leveraged the German alliance to gain advantages for Italy. Prior to Hitler's declaration of war against America there was little, if any, doubt that Italy would once again "follow Germany's lead." The declarations by Germany and Italy followed the publication of Rainbow Five by the US press on 4 December 1941, confirming the Europe first strategy, and they also enabled the Second Happy Time.

The United States Congress immediately responded by declaring war on Italy and Germany, bringing the United States fully into the European theater of the Second World War. The Axis powers also signed the "No Separate Peace Agreement" on 11 December, which pledged Italy, Germany, and Japan to not independently make peace with Britain or the United States. Mussolini is said to have "expressed no reservations" about war with the US, blaming the conflict on President Franklin D. Roosevelt.

== Background ==
On 7 December 1941, 353 aircraft of the Empire of Japan attacked the U.S. naval base at Pearl Harbor, inflicting mass destruction on American life and property and drawing the United States into the Second World War. On 8 December, in response to the attack, the United States declared war on Japan.

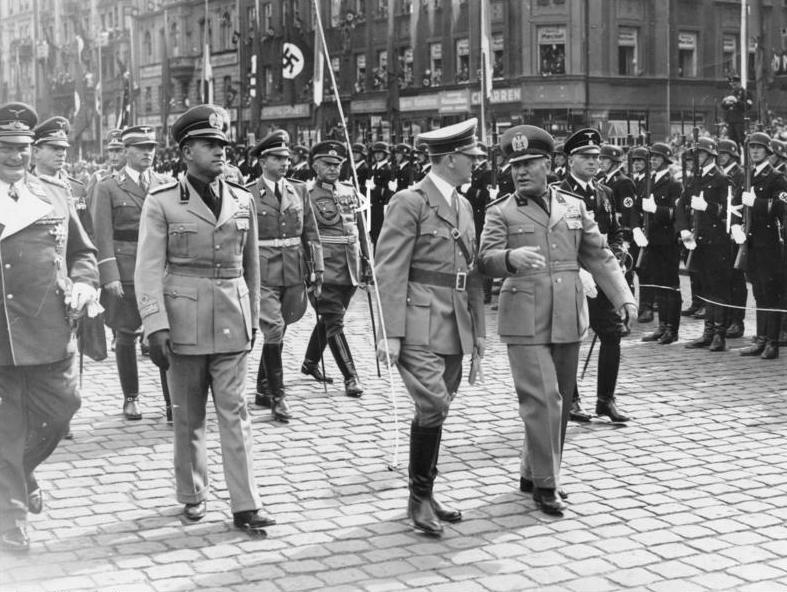
Mussolini, Hitler, and Foreign Minister Ciano in Munich, 1938

Three days later, at 2:45 PM on 11 December 1941, Italian dictator Benito Mussolini announced—from the balcony overlooking the Piazza Venezia in Rome—that Italy and Germany would "participate from today on the side of heroic Japan" against the United States. Japanese ambassador Zembei Horikiri, former Speaker of the Japanese House of Representatives, stood alongside Mussolini during the speech. German ambassador Hans Georg von Mackensen was also present. Adolf Hitler made his war announcement at the Reichstag in Berlin that same day, stating that while he had tried to avoid direct conflict with the U.S., Germany was obliged to join with Italy to defend Japan under the Tripartite Pact of 1940. Hitler also stated that "After victory has been achieved, Germany, Italy, and Japan will continue in closest co-operation with a view to establishing a new and just order."

A memo that George Wadsworth II, the U.S. chargé d'affaires to Italy, sent to the U.S. Secretary of State on 9 December 1941 confirmed that if Germany declared war, Italy would do likewise, stating: "Opinion in well-informed Rome circles is divided on the crying question of the day whether Germany will declare war on the United States. Italy, it is assumed without question, will follow Germany's lead whatever it be as a matter of course."

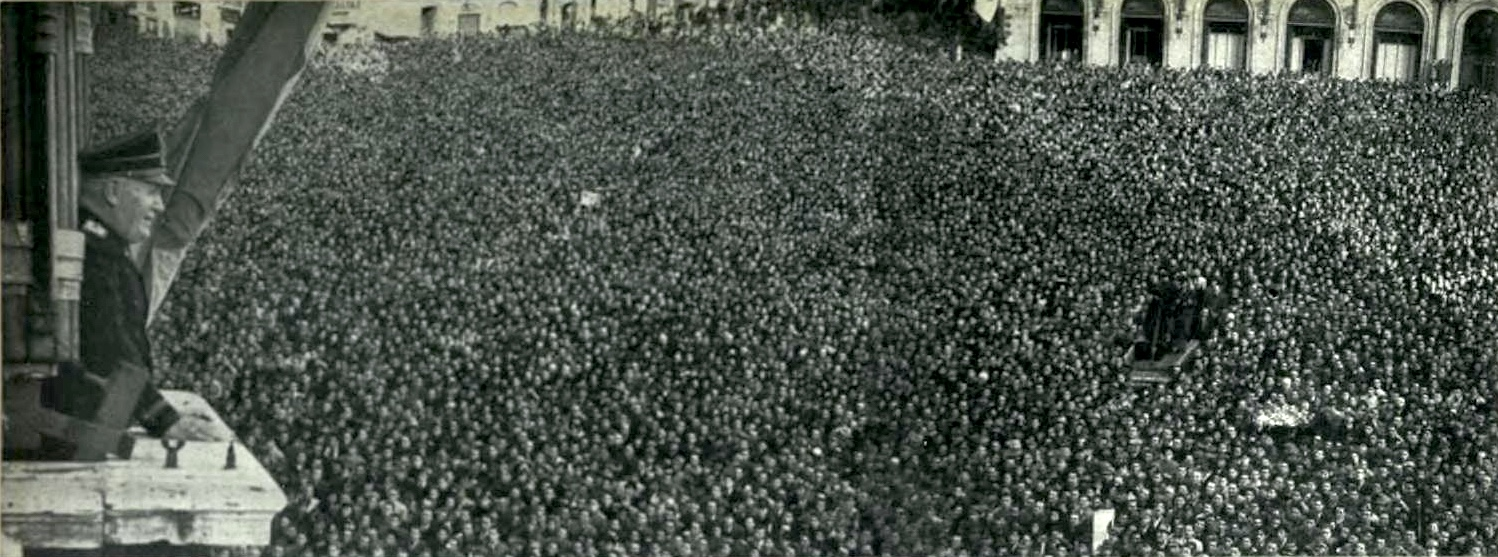
Crowd on the Piazza Venezia during Mussolini's speech, December 11, 1941. Published in L'Illustrazione Italiana.

At 2:30 PM on 11 December, just before Mussolini's speech, Italian Foreign Minister Galeazzo Ciano called for chargé d'affaires Wadsworth and revealed that Italy was at war with America, to which Wadsworth responded: "It is very tragic." Ciano recorded his thoughts on the occasion, saying, "It was three o'clock in the afternoon, the people were hungry, and the day was quite cold. These are all elements that do not make for enthusiasm."

On 11 December, the Axis powers also signed the "No Separate Peace Agreement," pledging each nation to not independently make peace with Britain or America, a decision that theoretically bound Italy, Germany, and Japan to a common fate. Mussolini "expressed no reservations about war with America," and laid responsibility for the conflict at the feet of President Roosevelt.

== Text of the declaration ==
Contrary to Hitler's nearly 90-minute tirade against America, Mussolini's war declaration lasted just four minutes. However, this made it only slightly shorter than President Roosevelt's "Day of Infamy" speech on 8 December. Foreign Minister Ciano described the speech as "brief and cutting," noting its "very pro-Japanese setting." "News of the naval victories [of Japan] has excited the Italian imagination," Ciano remarked. The English-language translation of Mussolini's speech was published as follows:

This is another day of solemn decision in Italy's history and of memorable events destined to give a new course to the history of continents.

The powers of the steel pact, Fascist Italy and Nationalist Socialist Germany, ever closely linked, participate from today on the side of heroic Japan against the United States of America.

The Tripartite Pact becomes a military alliance which draws around its colors 250,000,000 men determined to do all in order to win.

Neither the Axis nor Japan wanted an extension of the conflict.

One man, one man only, a real tyrannical democrat, through a series of infinite provocations, betraying with a supreme fraud the population of his country, wanted the war and had prepared for it day by day with diabolical obstinacy.

The formidable blows that on the immense Pacific expanse have been already inflicted on American forces show how prepared are the soldiers of the Empire of the Rising Sun.

I say to you, and you will understand, that it is a privilege to fight with them.

Today, the Tripartite Pact, with the plenitude of its forces and its moral and material resources, is a formidable instrument for the war and a certainty for victory.

Tomorrow, the Tripartite Pact will become an instrument of just peace between the peoples.

Italians! Once more arise and be worthy of this historical hour!

We shall win.

== See also ==
- Declarations of war during World War II
- Diplomatic history of World War II
- Kellogg–Briand Pact
