= British declaration of war on Japan =

1941 letter by Winston Churchill

The government of the United Kingdom declared war on the Empire of Japan on 8 December 1941, following the Japanese attacks on British Malaya, Singapore and Hong Kong on the previous day, as well as in response to the bombing of the American fleet at Pearl Harbor.

== Background ==
The United Kingdom declared war on Nazi Germany on 3 September 1939, two days after the outbreak of war in Europe. The Empire of Japan and Nazi Germany had signed the Anti-Comintern Pact in 1936, to counter the perceived threat of the communism of the Soviet Union. During negotiations with the administration of U.S. President Franklin D. Roosevelt, prime minister Winston Churchill had promised to declare war 'within the hour' of a Japanese attack on the United States.

On the 7th and 8th of December 1941, Japan attacked British and American territories in Southeast Asia and the Central Pacific with near-simultaneous offensives including an attack on the US fleet at Pearl Harbor.

== Decision and communication ==
News of the attack on Pearl Harbor reached London first. Realising that Roosevelt would go through the formal process of asking the United States Congress for a declaration of war, Churchill began preparing to deliver Britain's own declaration of war immediately after Congress had formally declared war. After learning British territory had also been attacked, Churchill decided there was no need to wait for Congress to act and promptly summoned Mamoru Shigemitsu, Ambassador of Japan to the United Kingdom.

Foreign Secretary Anthony Eden was in transit to Moscow at the time, so Churchill was in charge of the Foreign Office. Churchill instructed Shigemitsu to inform his government that a state of war existed between the two countries and drafted a letter to inform the ambassador of this. Of the letter, Churchill later wrote: "Some people did not like this ceremonial style. But after all when you have to kill a man it costs nothing to be polite."

The United Kingdom declared war on Japan nine hours before the United States. The earlier declaration by the British was due to their attacks on the colonies of Malaya, Singapore, and Hong Kong, and also due to the fact that they lacked the American constitutional tradition of requiring the consent of their own national legislature to declare war – the British cabinet could declare war without consulting Parliament, and could therefore act more quickly.

=== Churchill's letter ===
The text of Churchill's letter to Shigemitsu is as follows:

Sir,

On the evening of December 7th His Majesty's Government in the United Kingdom learned that Japanese forces without previous warning either in the form of a declaration of war or of an ultimatum with a conditional declaration of war had attempted a landing on the coast of Malaya and bombed Singapore and Hong Kong.

In view of these wanton acts of unprovoked aggression committed in flagrant violation of International Law and particularly of Article I of the Third Hague Convention relative to the opening of hostilities, to which both Japan and the United Kingdom are parties, His Majesty's Ambassador at Tokyo has been instructed to inform the Imperial Japanese Government in the name of His Majesty's Government in the United Kingdom that a state of war exists between our two countries.

I have the honour to be, with high consideration,

Sir,
Your obedient servant,
Winston S. Churchill

== See also ==
- Arcadia Conference
- Declaration of war
- Declarations of war by Great Britain and the United Kingdom
- Declarations of war during World War II
- Diplomatic history of World War II
- Japanese declaration of war on the United States and the British Empire
- British declaration of war on Germany (1939)
- United States declaration of war on Japan

== Sources ==
- Churchill, Winston S., The Second World War (vol. 3): The Grand Alliance (1950) ISBN 0-395-41057-6.
- Wohlstetter, Roberta (1962), Pearl Harbor: Warning and Decision, Stanford University Press.
