= United States declaration of war on Japan =

Declaration of state of war with Japan
- Long title: "Joint Resolution Declaring that a state of war exists between the Imperial Government of Japan and the Government and the people of the United States and making provisions to prosecute the same."
- Enacted by: the 77th United States Congress
- Effective: December 8, 1941

Citations
- Public law: Pub. L. 77–328
- Statutes at Large: 55 Stat. 795

Legislative history
- Introduced in the Senate as S.J.Res.116; Passed the Senate on 8 December 1941 (82-0); Passed the House on 8 December 1941 (388-1); Signed into law by President Franklin D. Roosevelt on 8 December 1941

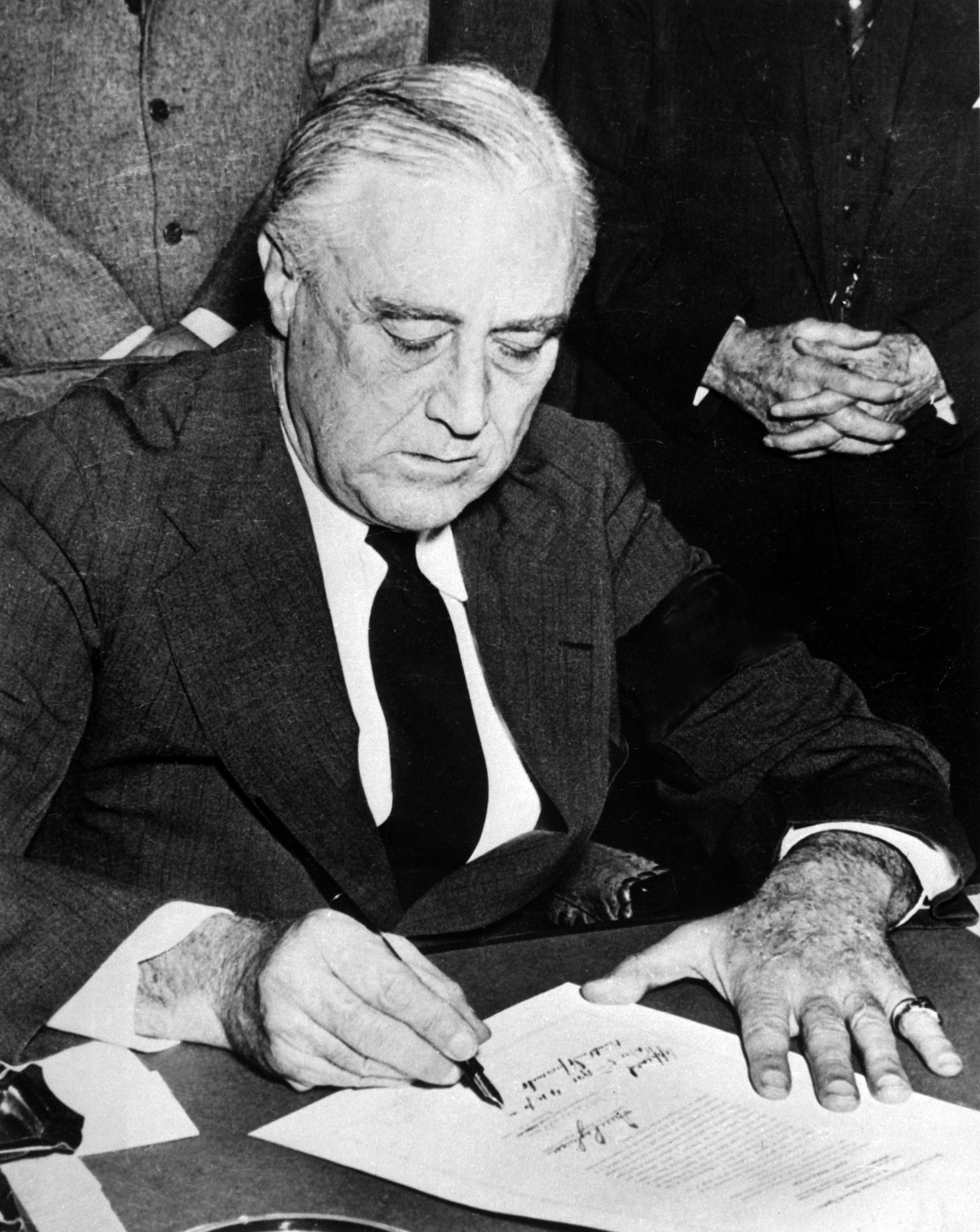
President Roosevelt, wearing a black armband, signs the Declaration of War on Japan on December 8, 1941

On December 8, 1941, at 12:30 PM ET, the 77th United States Congress declared war (Pub. L. 77–328, 55 Stat. 795) on the Empire of Japan in response to its surprise attack on Pearl Harbor and subsequent declaration of war the prior day. The Joint Resolution Declaring that a state of war exists between the Imperial Government of Japan and the Government and the people of the United States and making provisions to prosecute the same was formulated an hour after the Infamy Speech of President Franklin D. Roosevelt. Following the U.S. declaration, Japan's allies, Germany and Italy, declared war on the United States, bringing the United States fully into World War II. The Japanese government had originally intended to deliver their own declaration of war thirty minutes before the attack, but the Japanese embassy in Washington took too long to decode the 5,000-word document.

== Background ==
The attack on Pearl Harbor took place before a declaration of war by Japan had been delivered to the United States. This attack caused more than 3,400 U.S. military casualties. It was originally stipulated that the attack should not commence until thirty minutes after Japan had informed the U.S. that it was withdrawing from further peace negotiations, but the attack began before the notice could be delivered. Tokyo transmitted the 5,000-word notification – known as the "14-Part Message" – in two blocks to the Japanese Embassy in Washington. Included in this message was a statement that read, "officers and men of our army and navy will concentrate their strength in engaging in battles, the members of our government will endeavor to carry out their assigned duties, our subjects throughout the empire will employ full strength to perform their respective tasks. Thus uniting one hundred million hearts and discharging the fullest strength of the nation, we expect all our subjects to strive to attain the ultimate objective of this expedition." However, because of the very secret nature of the message, it had to be decoded, translated and typed up by senior embassy officials, who were unable to do these tasks in the available time. Hence, the ambassador did not deliver it until after the attack had begun. Even if it had been, the notification was worded so that it actually neither declared war nor severed diplomatic relations; it was therefore not a proper declaration of war as required by diplomatic traditions. Japan formally declared war on the U.S. and the British Empire on 7 December 1941, hours after launching their attack; this marked the United States' entry into the war.

The United Kingdom declared war on Japan nine hours before the U.S. did, partially due to Japanese attacks on the British colonies of Malaya, Singapore, and Hong Kong; and partially due to Winston Churchill's promise to declare war "within the hour" of a Japanese attack on the United States. Although many of the American people were sympathetic to Britain during the war with Nazi Germany, there was widespread opposition to American intervention in European affairs.

== Vote and presidential signature ==
President Roosevelt formally requested the declaration in his Day of Infamy speech, addressed to a joint session of Congress and the nation at 12:30 p.m. on December 8. Roosevelt's speech described the attack on Pearl Harbor as a deliberately planned attack by Japan on the United States. The speech described the loss of American naval and military forces as well as the loss of American lives. Further, Roosevelt cited other attacks that took place by Japan during the attack on Pearl Harbor, including attacks on Malaya, Hong Kong, and Guam. The speech was met with widespread support. The declaration was quickly brought to a vote; it passed the Senate, and then passed the House at 1:10 p.m. The vote was 82–0 in the Senate and 388–1 in the House. Roosevelt signed the declaration at 4:10 p.m the same day.

The first woman elected to Congress, Jeannette Rankin, a Montana Republican and outspoken pacifist, cast the only vote against the declaration, eliciting hisses from some of her peers. In 1917, Rankin was among 56 members of Congress to vote against the declaration that triggered America's entry into World War I. Now alone in her position, several of Rankin's congressional colleagues pressed her to change her vote to make the resolution unanimous—or at least to abstain—but she refused, saying "As a woman, I can't go to war, and I refuse to send anyone else." Rankin was one of ten women holding Congressional seats at the time. After the vote, reporters followed her into the Republican cloakroom, where she refused to make any comments and took refuge in a telephone booth until United States Capitol Police cleared the cloakroom. Two days later, a similar war declaration against Germany and Italy came to vote; Rankin abstained.

== Text of the declaration ==
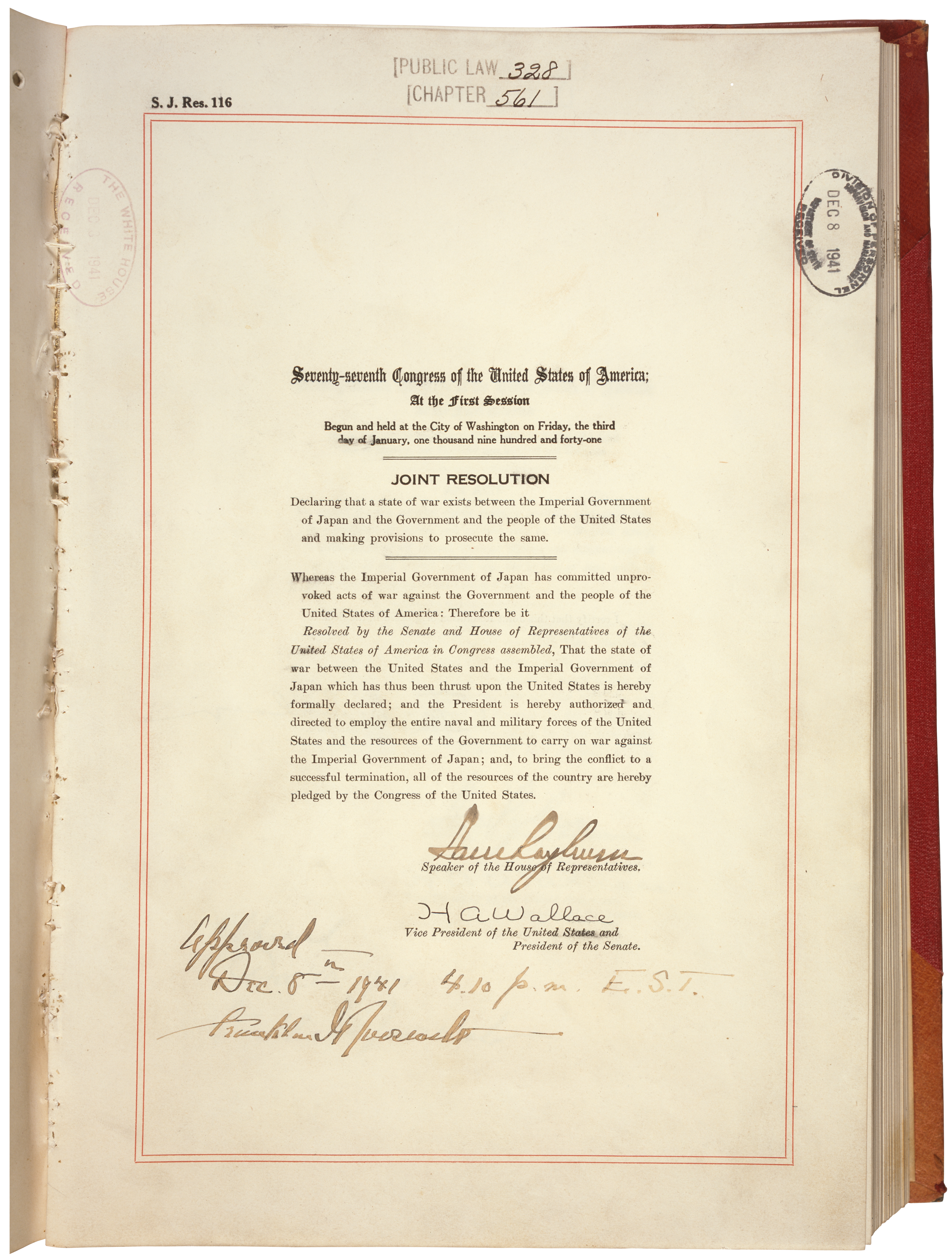
U.S. Congress Joint Resolution signed by President Roosevelt on December 8, 1941, at 4:10 p.m., Public Law 77-328, 55 STAT 795, which declared war on Japan.

JOINT RESOLUTION

Declaring that a state of war exists between the Imperial Government of Japan and the Government and the people of the United States and making provisions to prosecute the same.

Whereas the Imperial Government of Japan has committed unprovoked acts of war against the Government and the people of the United States of America: Therefore be it

Resolved by the Senate and House of Representatives of the United States of America in Congress assembled, That the state of war between the United States and the Imperial Government of Japan which has thus been thrust upon the United States is hereby formally declared; and the President is hereby authorized and directed to employ the entire naval and military forces of the United States and the resources of the Government to carry on war against the Imperial Government of Japan; and, to bring the conflict to a successful termination, all the resources of the country are hereby pledged by the Congress of the United States.

== See also ==
- Arcadia Conference
- British declaration of war on Japan
- Declaration of war by the United States
- Declarations of war during World War II
- Diplomatic history of World War II
- Japanese declaration of war on the United States and the British Empire
- Kellogg–Briand Pact
- United States declaration of war on Germany (1941)
- United States declaration of war on Italy
