= Day of Infamy speech =

1941 speech by President Franklin D. Roosevelt

"Day of Infamy"
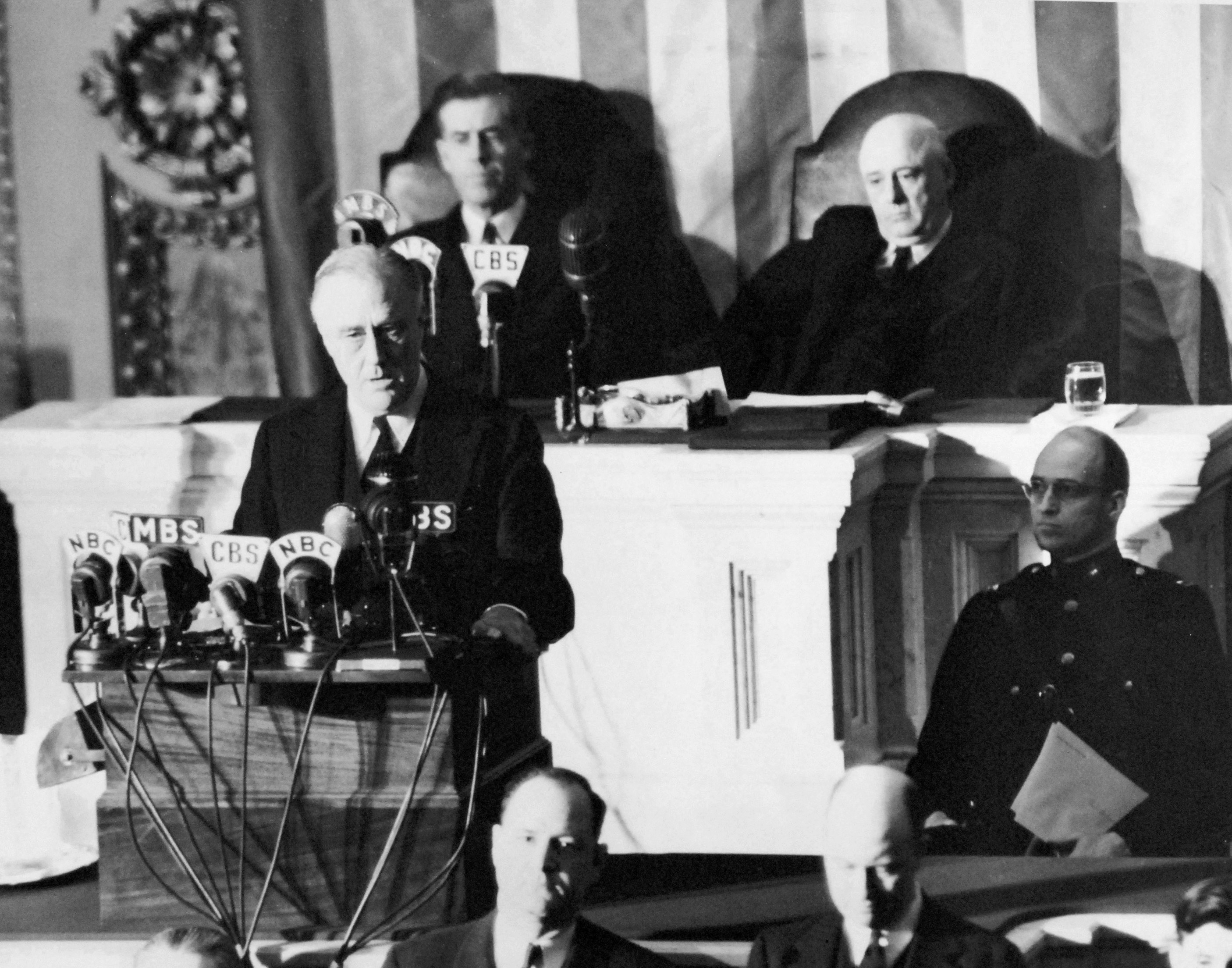
- Roosevelt delivering the speech before a Joint Session of Congress on December 8, 1941
- Date: December 8, 1941; 84 years ago
- Duration: Approximately 6.5 minutes
- Venue: United States Capitol
- Location: Washington, D.C., U.S.; 38°53′23″N 77°00′32″W
- Type: Speech
- Participants: U.S. President Franklin D. Roosevelt
- An excerpt from the speech where Roosevelt says "... a date which will live in infamy".

The "Day of Infamy" speech, sometimes referred to as the Infamy speech, was a speech delivered by Franklin D. Roosevelt, the 32nd president of the United States, to a joint session of Congress on December 8, 1941. The previous day, the Empire of Japan attacked United States military bases at Pearl Harbor and declared war on the United States and the British Empire. The speech is known for its famed first line, which opened with Roosevelt saying, "Yesterday, December 7, 1941—a date which will live in infamy..."

On Sunday, December 7, 1941, the United States Navy base at Pearl Harbor in the Territory of Hawaii was attacked by 353 Imperial Japanese Navy Air Service aircraft in a surprise military strike, destroying various American ships and aircraft, and killing over 2,400 civilians and military personnel. After consulting his cabinet, Roosevelt decided to deliver an address before the joint session of Congress the next day.

Roosevelt's speech was worded to reinforce his portrayal of the United States as a victim of unprovoked Japanese aggression and appealed to patriotism rather than to idealism. Roosevelt's choice to speak promptly helped make the speech rhetorically powerful. According to author Sandra Silberstein, the speech followed a well-established tradition of how "through rhetorical conventions, presidents assume extraordinary powers as the commander in chief, dissent is minimized, enemies are vilified, and lives are lost in the defense of a nation once again united under God".

The speech had an immediate positive response and long-lasting impact. It is one of the most famous speeches of American politics. It was broadcast live by radio and attracted the largest audience in American radio history, with over 81% of adult American listeners tuning in to hear the speech. Soon after the speech, Congress almost unanimously declared war against Japan, formally entering World War II. The White House later received several telegrams praising Roosevelt's stance. The speech has since been used in various films. Roosevelt's description of December 7, 1941, as "a date which will live in infamy" has been compared with November 22, 1963, the date of the assassination of John F. Kennedy and the terrorist attacks of September 11, 2001.

== Background ==
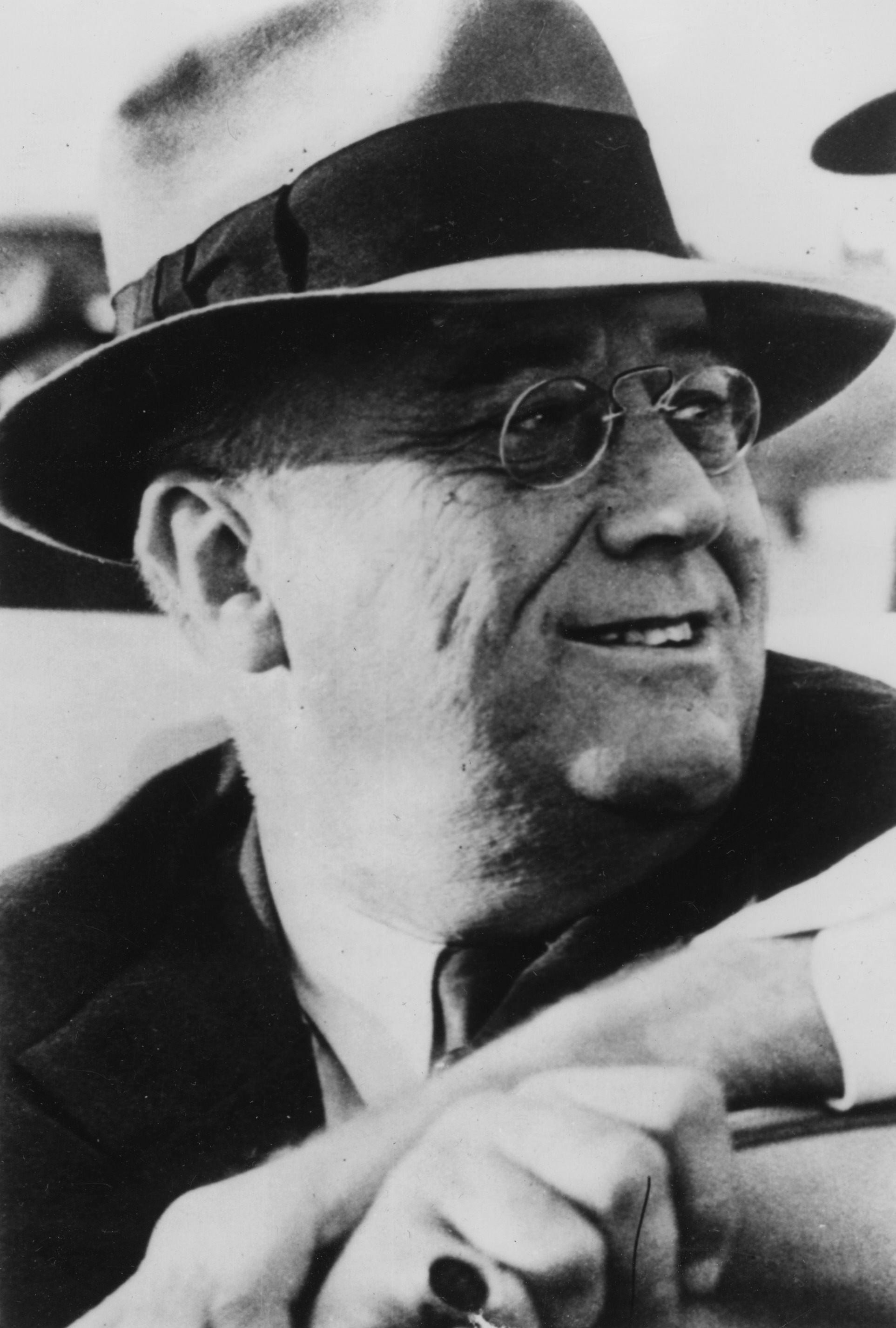
Franklin D. Roosevelt in 1940

Franklin D. Roosevelt was born in 1882 in Dutchess County, New York. Initially working at a law firm, he later became a member of the New York state senate. He served as the assistant secretary of the Navy under President Woodrow Wilson and was elected the 44th governor of New York. He won the 1932 presidential election and was inaugurated as the president in 1933. He was re-elected in 1936, and in 1940, he won an unprecedented third term.

On December 7, 1941, the American naval base at Pearl Harbor in the Territory of Hawaii was attacked by 353 Imperial Japanese Navy Air Service aircraft in a surprise military strike at 7:48 a.m. HST (12:48 p.m. EST). Subsequently, 21 American ships and approximately 350 aircraft were destroyed, and more than 2,400 civilians and military personnel were killed. Within a few minutes after the attack began, Roosevelt was informed shortly after 1:00 p.m. EST, while he was having lunch with Harry Hopkins. Frank Knox, the Secretary of the Navy, sent a phoned message which read: "Air raid on Pearl Harbor. This is not a drill." Roosevelt soon ordered the mobilization of all military personnel. His secretary stated that the attacks were made "wholly without warning when both nations were at peace". Roosevelt consulted his cabinet and members of Congress. According to author George T. McJimsey, Roosevelt told them not to lay blame, but to concentrate on the fact that the United States was "in it". The British prime minister Winston Churchill telephoned Roosevelt from Chequers and said: "We are all in the same boat now."

Though he was crippled by polio, Roosevelt was widely seen as a charismatic speaker. Laura Crowell of the University of Washington wrote that Roosevelt worked diligently on his speeches, and he "regularly provided the basic thoughts which he wanted to incorporate in an address ... [brought] the manuscript to the precise length; content and tone he desired is now widely understood." Roosevelt decided to deliver an address before the joint session of Congress the next day. McJimsey wrote that the attack gave him a "definite direction and purpose".

== Address to the joint session ==
Day of Infamy speech
President Roosevelt's address to the joint session, followed by the national anthem—"The Star-Spangled Banner"

The Infamy Speech was a brief address of approximately 6 minutes 30 seconds, delivered to a joint session of the Congress at 12:30 p.m. on December 8, 1941. Secretary of State Cordell Hull had recommended to Roosevelt to devote more time to the exposition of Japanese-American relations and the lengthy but unsuccessful effort to find a peaceful solution. However, Roosevelt kept the speech brief in the belief that it would have a more dramatic effect. Roosevelt's revised statement was stronger for its emphatic insistence that posterity would endorse the American view of the attack. It was intended not merely as a personal response by Roosevelt, but as a statement on behalf of the all-American people in the face of great collective trauma. According to sociologist Jeffrey C. Alexander and other authors of the book Cultural Trauma and Collective Identity, the speech worked to crystallize and channel the response of the nation into a collective response and resolve.

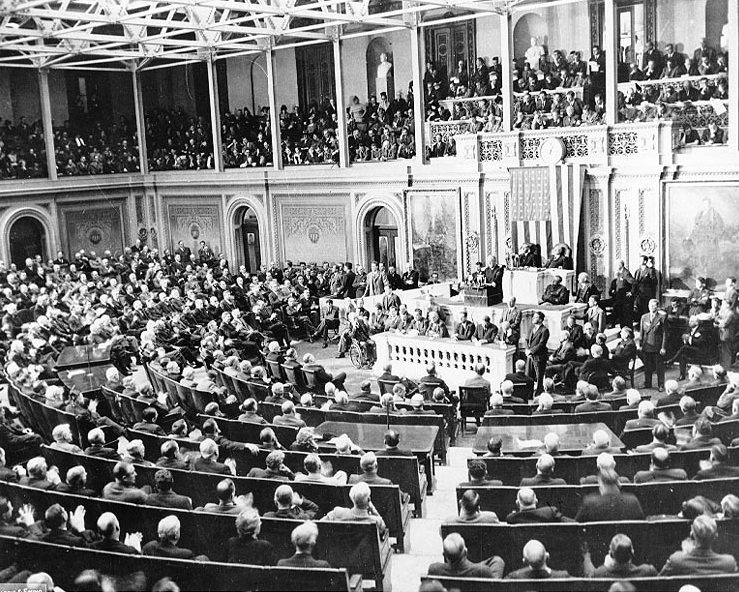
Roosevelt delivering the speech to the Congress

The first paragraph of the speech was worded to reinforce Roosevelt's portrayal of the United States as a victim of unprovoked Japanese aggression. The initial draft read, "a date which will live in world history". Roosevelt rephrased it as "a date which will live in infamy." The wording was deliberately passive. Rather than speaking in the active voice ("Japan attacked the United States"), Roosevelt chose to speak in the passive voice to emphasize America's status as a victim. Roosevelt said:

Yesterday, December 7, 1941—a date which will live in infamy—the United States of America was suddenly and deliberately attacked by naval and air forces of the Empire of Japan.
The United States was at peace with that Nation and, at the solicitation of Japan, was still in conversation with its Government and its Emperor looking toward the maintenance of peace in the Pacific. Indeed, one hour after Japanese air squadrons had commenced bombing in the American Island of Oahu, the Japanese Ambassador to the United States and his colleague delivered to our Secretary of State a formal reply to a recent American message. And while this reply stated that it seemed useless to continue the existing diplomatic negotiations, it contained no threat or hint of war or of armed attack.

Roosevelt said that the distance from Japan to Hawaii made it obvious that the attack was planned "days or even weeks ago". The theme of "innocence violated" was further reinforced by the mention of the ongoing diplomatic negotiations with Japan, which Roosevelt characterized as having been pursued cynically and dishonestly by the Japanese government while it was secretly preparing for war against the United States. He consciously sought to avoid making the sort of more abstract appeal that had been issued by President Wilson in his speech to Congress in April 1917, when the United States entered World War I. Wilson laid out the strategic threat posed by Germany and stressed the idealistic goals behind America's participation in the war. During the 1930s, however, the public opinion turned strongly against such themes and was wary of idealistic visions of remaking the world through just war. Roosevelt's speech was aimed more at the gut level, in effect, which was an appeal to patriotism rather than to idealism. Though, he drew a symbolic link with the April 1917 declaration of war: he was accompanied to the joint session by Edith Bolling Wilson, President Wilson's widow.

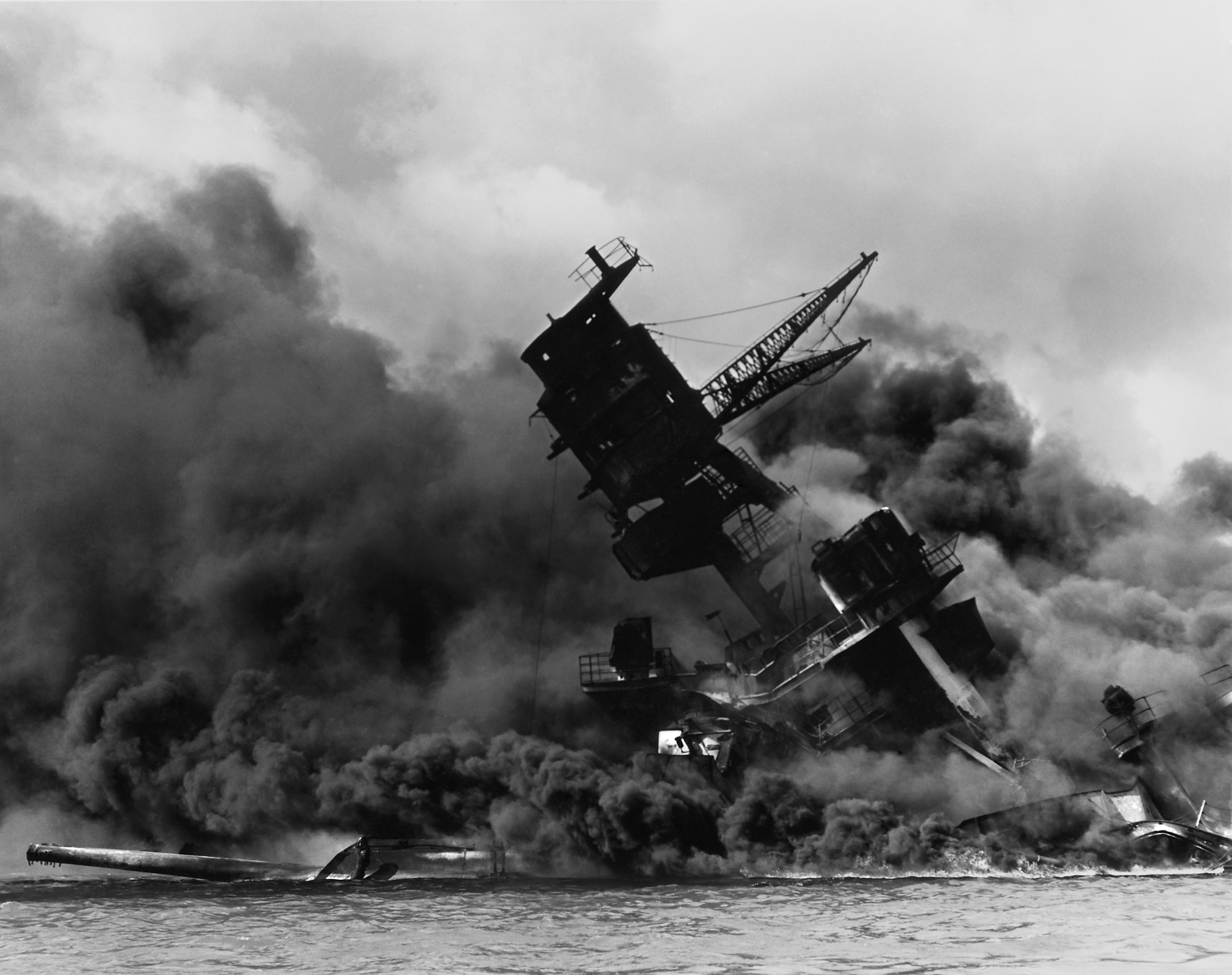
The wreckage of USS Arizona ablaze after the attack

The "infamy framework" adopted by Roosevelt gained additional resonance by the fact that it followed the pattern of earlier narratives of great American defeats. The Battle of the Little Bighorn in 1876 and the sinking of the USS Maine in 1898 had both been the source of intense national outrage and a determination to take the fight to the enemy. Defeats and setbacks were, on each occasion, portrayed as being merely a springboard towards an eventual and inevitable victory. According to Sandra Silberstein, Roosevelt's speech followed a well-established tradition of how "through rhetorical conventions, presidents assume extraordinary powers as the commander in chief, dissent is minimized, enemies are vilified, and lives are lost in the defense of a nation once again united under God". Roosevelt expertly employed the idea of kairos, which relates to speaking promptly; this made the Infamy Speech powerful and rhetorically important. Delivering his speech on the day after the attack on Pearl Harbor, Roosevelt presented himself as immediately ready to face this issue, indicating its importance to both him and the nation.

Roosevelt also made a point of emphasizing that "our people, our territory and our interests are in grave danger", and highlighted reports of Japanese attacks in the Pacific between Hawaii and San Francisco. He sought to silence the isolationist movement which had campaigned against American involvement in the war in Europe. He concluded the speech saying:

No matter how long it may take us to overcome this premeditated invasion, the American people in their righteous might will win through to absolute victory. I believe that I interpret the will of the Congress and of the people when I assert that we will not only defend ourselves to the uttermost but will make it very certain that this form of treachery shall never again endanger us. Hostilities exist. There is no blinking at the fact that our people, our territory, and our interests are in grave danger. With confidence in our armed forces—with the unbounding determination of our people—we will gain the inevitable triumph—so help us God. I ask that the Congress declare that since the unprovoked and dastardly attack by Japan on Sunday, December 7, 1941, a state of war has existed between the United States and the Japanese Empire.

== Impact and legacy ==
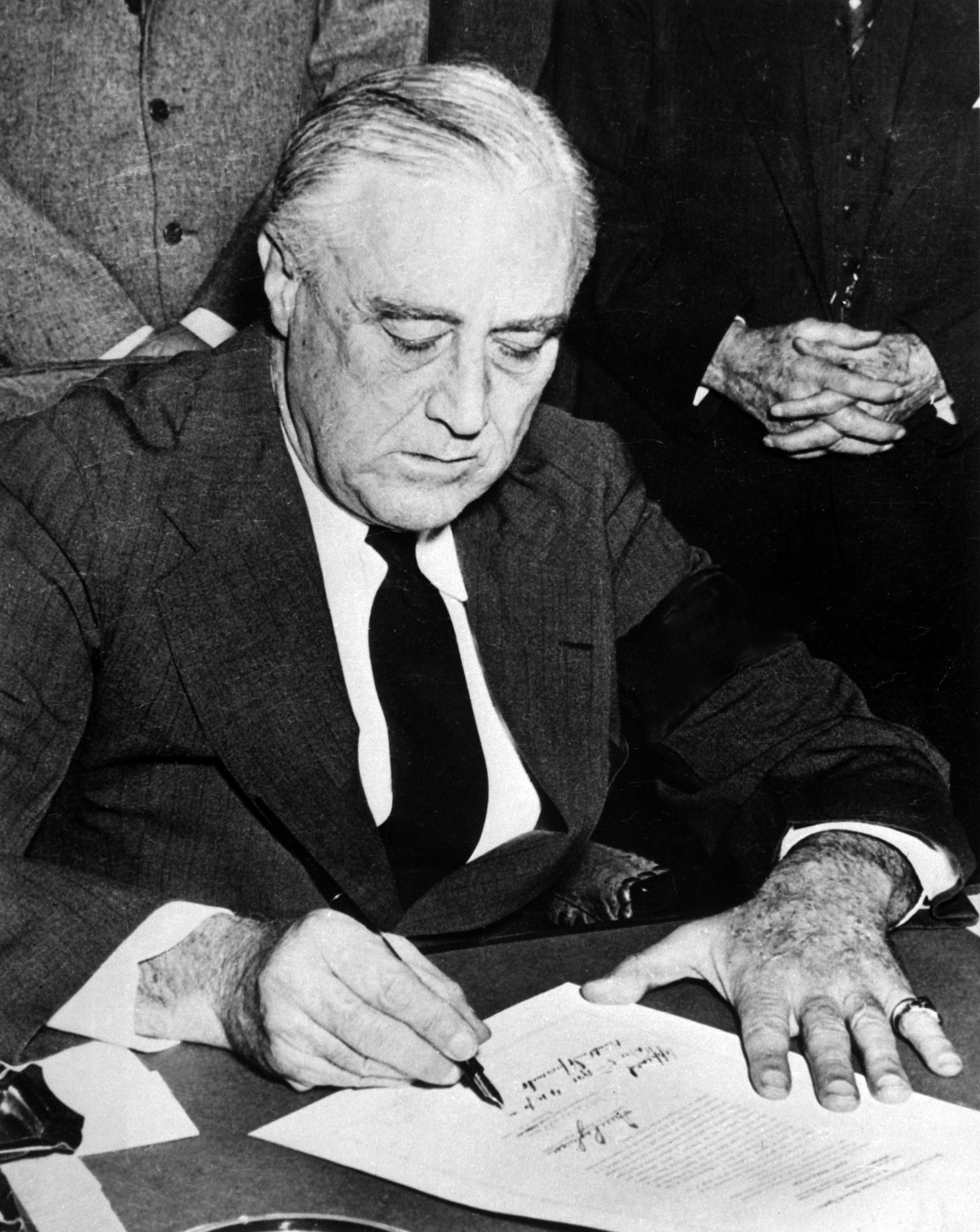
Franklin D. Roosevelt signing the declaration of war against Japan

Roosevelt's speech had an immediate and long-lasting impact and was referred to as one of the most famous speeches of American politics. Thirty-three minutes after he finished speaking, Congress declared war against Japan, with only one Representative, Jeannette Rankin, voting against the declaration. The speech was broadcast live by radio and attracted the largest audience in American radio history, with over 81% of people tuning in to hear the speech. The response was positive, both within and outside of Congress. Samuel Irving Rosenman, who served as an adviser to Roosevelt, described the scene as the "most dramatic spectacle there in the chamber of the House of Representatives". He said that the spirit of cooperation came equally from both Democratic and Republican sides, and the "new feeling of unity which suddenly welled up in the chamber on December 8, the common purpose behind the leadership of the President, the joint determination to see things through, were typical of what was taking place throughout the country."

The White House was inundated with telegrams praising Roosevelt's stance. One writer wrote: "On that Sunday, we were dismayed and frightened, but your unbounded courage pulled us together." Recruiting stations were jammed with a surge of volunteers, and had to go on 24-hour duty to deal with the crowds seeking to sign up, in numbers reported to be twice as high as after Wilson's declaration of war in 1917. The anti-war and isolationist movement collapsed in the wake of the speech, with even the president's fiercest critics falling into line. Charles Lindbergh, who had been a leading isolationist, gave a statement endorsing Roosevelt's speech. He said: "Our country has been attacked by force of arms, and by force of arms we must retaliate. We must now turn every effort to building the greatest and most efficient Army, Navy, and Air Force in the world." However, controversial Detroit area priest Charles Coughlin, who previously did national radio sermons and now published the Social Justice periodical magazine, would oppose U.S. entry into World War II even after the bombing of Pearl Harbor, alleging that Jews had planned the war for their own benefit and had conspired to involve the United States.

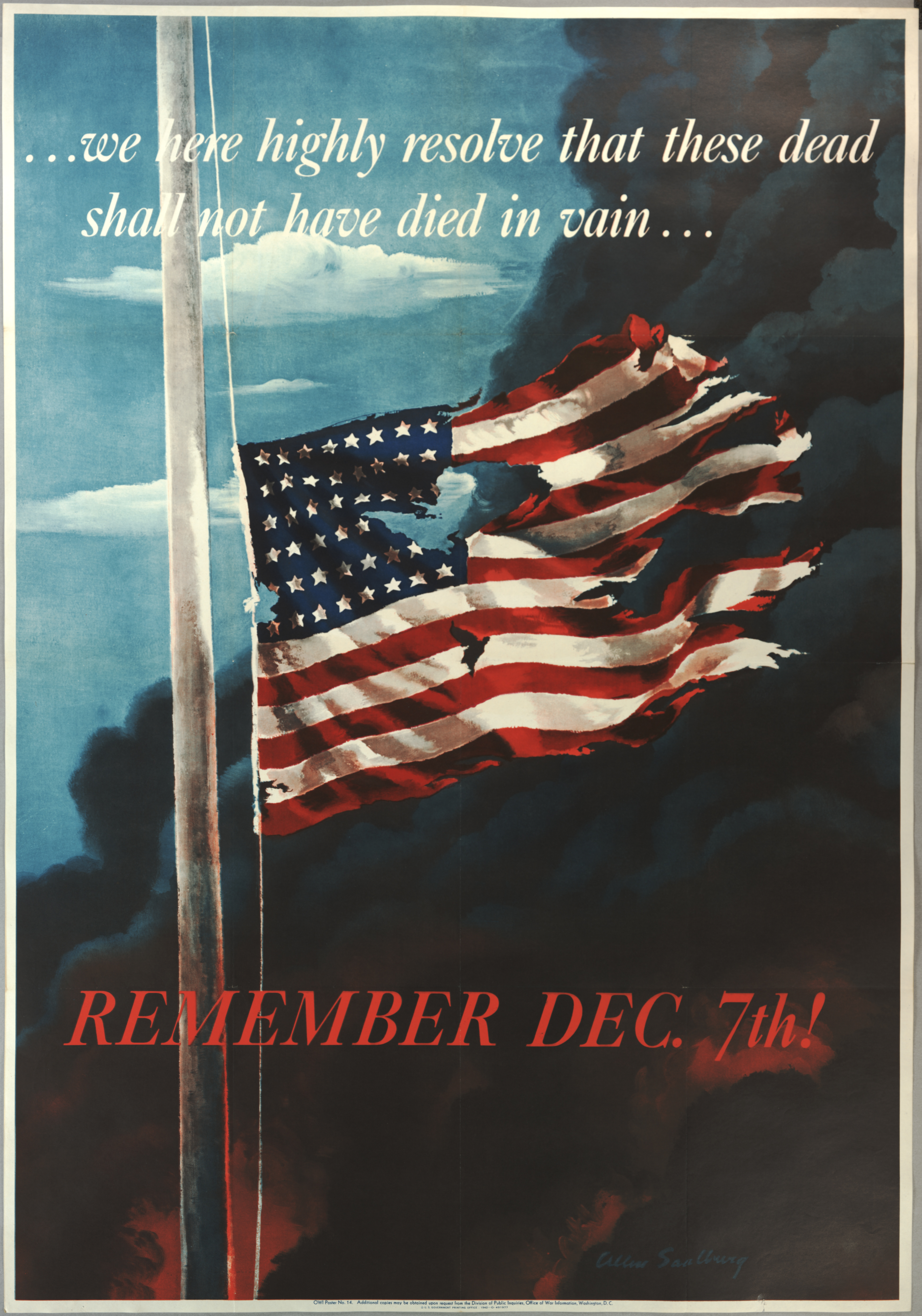
"Remember December 7th!", by Allen Saalburg, poster issued in 1942 by the United States Office of War Information

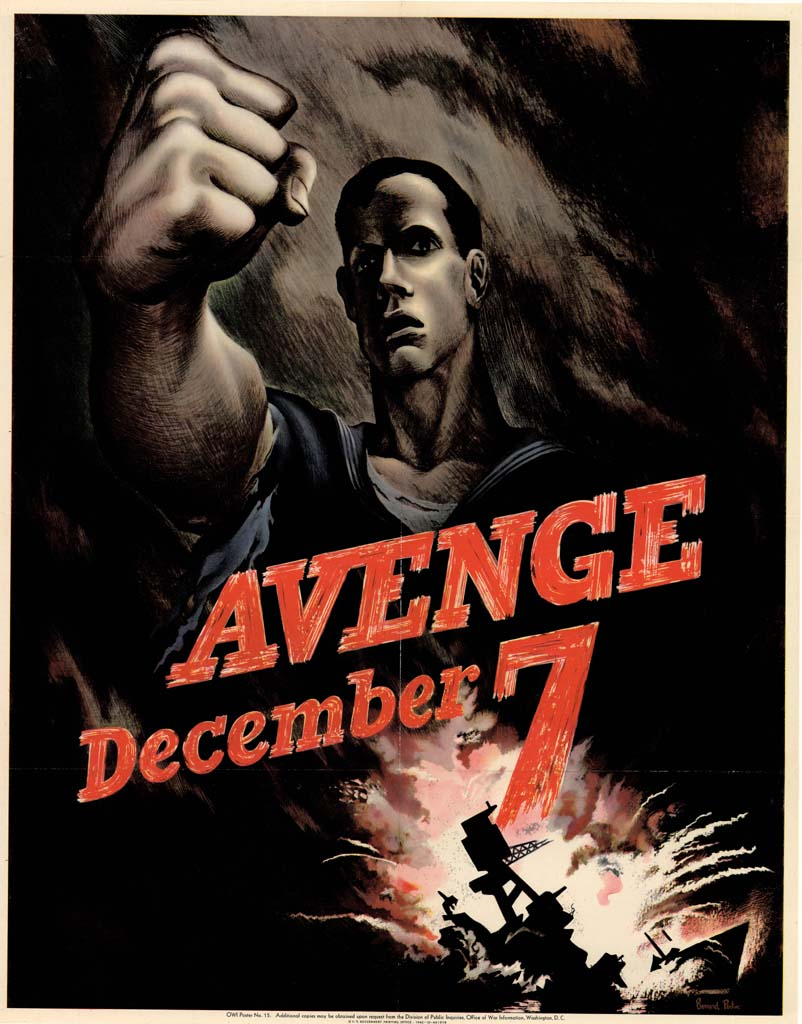
"Avenge December 7!", poster issued in 1942 by the United States Office of War Information

The speech's infamy line is often misquoted as "a day that will live in infamy". However, Roosevelt emphasized the date—December 7, 1941—rather than the day of the attack, a Sunday, which he mentioned only in the last line of the speech. He sought to emphasize the historic nature of the events at Pearl Harbor, implicitly urging the American people never to forget the attack and memorialize its date. The term "day of infamy" has become widely used by the media to refer to any moment of supreme disgrace or evil.

Roosevelt's framing of the Pearl Harbor attack became, in effect, the standard American narrative of the events of December 7, 1941. Hollywood adopted the narrative in several war films including Wake Island (1942), the Academy Award-winning Air Force and the films Man from Frisco (1944), and Betrayal from the East (1945); all included actual radio reports of the pre-December 7 negotiations with the Japanese, reinforcing the message of enemy duplicity. Across the Pacific (1942), Salute to the Marines (1943), and Spy Ship (1942) used a similar device, relating the progress of United States–Japanese relations through newspaper headlines. The theme of American innocence betrayed was also frequently depicted on screen, the melodramatic aspects of the narrative lending themselves naturally to the movies.

Roosevelt's description of December 7, 1941, as "a date which will live in infamy" was borne out; the date became shorthand for the Pearl Harbor attack in much the same way that November 22, 1963, and September 11, 2001, became inextricably associated with the assassination of John F. Kennedy and the September 11 attacks. The slogans "Remember December 7th" and "Avenge December 7" were adopted as a rallying cry and were widely displayed on posters and lapel pins. Prelude to War (1942), the first of Frank Capra's Why We Fight film series (1942–45), urged Americans to remember the date of the Japanese invasion of Manchuria, September 18, 1931, "as well as we remember December 7, 1941, for on that date in 1931, the war we are now fighting began". The symbolism of the date was highlighted in a scene in the 1943 film Bombardier, in which the leader of a group of airmen walks up to a calendar on the wall, points to the date, and tells his men: "Gentlemen, there's a date we will always remember—and they'll never forget!"

The continuing resonance of the Infamy Speech was demonstrated following the September 11 attacks, which many commentators also compared with Pearl Harbor in terms of its lasting impression on the world. In the days following the attacks, Richard Jackson noted in his book Writing the War on Terrorism: Language, Politics and Counter-terrorism that "there [was] a deliberate and sustained effort" on the part of the President George W. Bush's administration to "discursively link September 11, 2001 to the attack on Pearl Harbor itself", both by directly invoking Roosevelt's Infamy Speech and by re-using the themes employed by Roosevelt in his speech. In Bush's speech to the nation on September 11, 2001, he contrasted the "evil, despicable acts of terror" with the "brightest beacon for freedom and opportunity" that America represented in his view. Sandra Silberstein drew direct parallels between the language used by Roosevelt and Bush, highlighting several similarities between the Infamy Speech and Bush's presidential address. Emily S. Rosenberg noted rhetorical efforts to link the conflicts of 1941 and 2001 by re-utilizing World War II terminology of the sort used by Roosevelt, such as using the term axis to refer to America's enemies (as in the "Axis of Evil").

Spanish Prime Minister José Maria Aznar referenced the speech hours after the 2004 Madrid train bombings, saying, "On March 11, 2004, it already occupies its place in the history of infamy." In 2019, Daniel Immerwahr wrote that in the speech's editing, Roosevelt elevated Hawaii as part of America, and downgraded the Philippines as foreign. On January 6, 2021, following the storming of the Capitol, Senator Chuck Schumer added that date to the "very short list of dates in American history that will live forever in infamy."

== Full text ==
TO THE CONGRESS OF THE UNITED STATES:

Yesterday, December 7, 1941—a date which will live in infamy—the United States of America was suddenly and deliberately attacked by naval and air forces of the Empire of Japan.

The United States was at peace with that Nation and, at the solicitation of Japan, was still in conversation with its Government and its Emperor looking toward the maintenance of peace in the Pacific. Indeed, one hour after Japanese air squadrons had commenced bombing in the American Island of Oahu, the Japanese Ambassador to the United States and his colleague delivered to our Secretary of State a formal reply to a recent American message. And while this reply stated that it seemed useless to continue the existing diplomatic negotiations, it contained no threat or hint of war or of armed attack.

It will be recorded that the distance of Hawaii from Japan makes it obvious that the attack was deliberately planned many days or even weeks ago. During the intervening time the Japanese Government has deliberately sought to deceive the United States by false statements and expressions of hope for continued peace.

The attack yesterday on the Hawaiian Islands has caused severe damage to American naval and military forces. I regret to tell you that very many American lives have been lost. In addition American ships have been reported torpedoed on the high seas between San Francisco and Honolulu.

Yesterday the Japanese Government also launched an attack against Malaya. Last night Japanese forces attacked Hong Kong. Last night Japanese forces attacked Guam. Last night Japanese forces attacked the Philippine Islands. Last night the Japanese attacked Wake Island. And this morning the Japanese attacked Midway Island.

Japan has, therefore, undertaken a surprise offensive extending throughout the Pacific area. The facts of yesterday and today speak for themselves. The people of the United States have already formed their opinions and well understand the implications to the very life and safety of our Nation.

As Commander in Chief of the Army and Navy I have directed that all measures be taken for our defense.

But always will our whole Nation remember the character of the onslaught against us.

No matter how long it may take us to overcome this premeditated invasion, the American people in their righteous might will win through to absolute victory. I believe that I interpret the will of the Congress and of the people when I assert that we will not only defend ourselves to the uttermost but will make it very certain that this form of treachery shall never again endanger us.

Hostilities exist. There is no blinking at the fact that our people, our territory, and our interests are in grave danger.

With confidence in our armed forces—with the unbounding determination of our people—we will gain the inevitable triumph- so help us God.

I ask that the Congress declare that since the unprovoked and dastardly attack by Japan on Sunday, December 7, 1941, a state of war has existed between the United States and the Japanese Empire.

Franklin D. Roosevelt

The White House, December 8, 1941

== Gallery ==
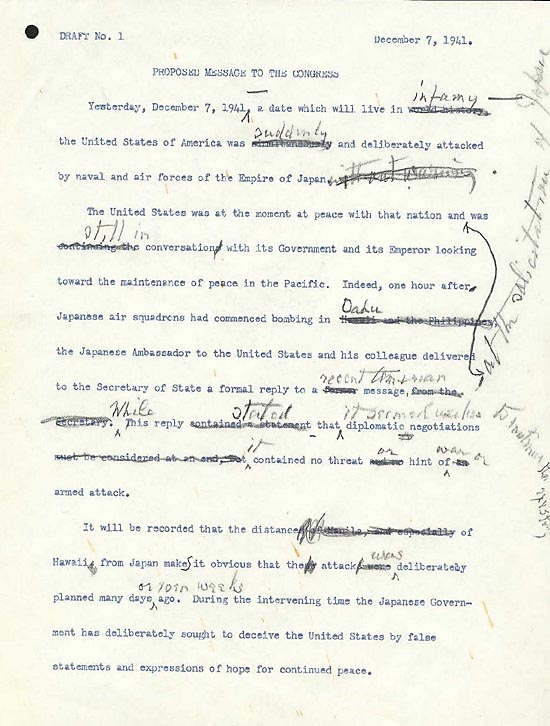
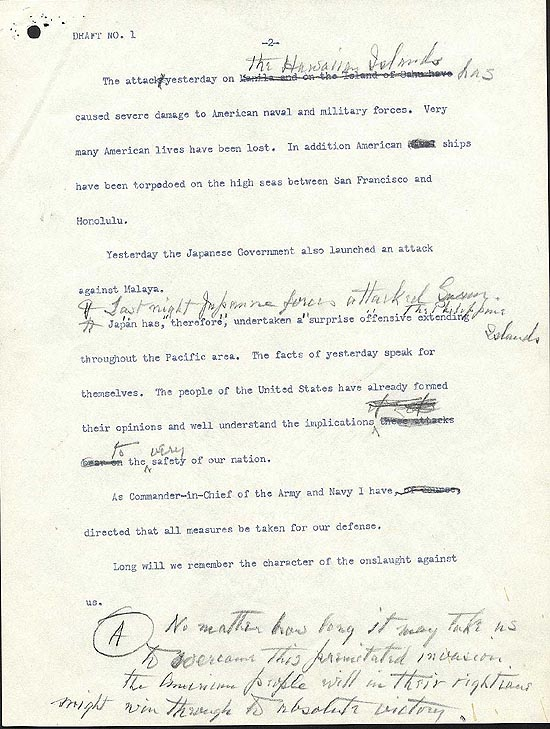
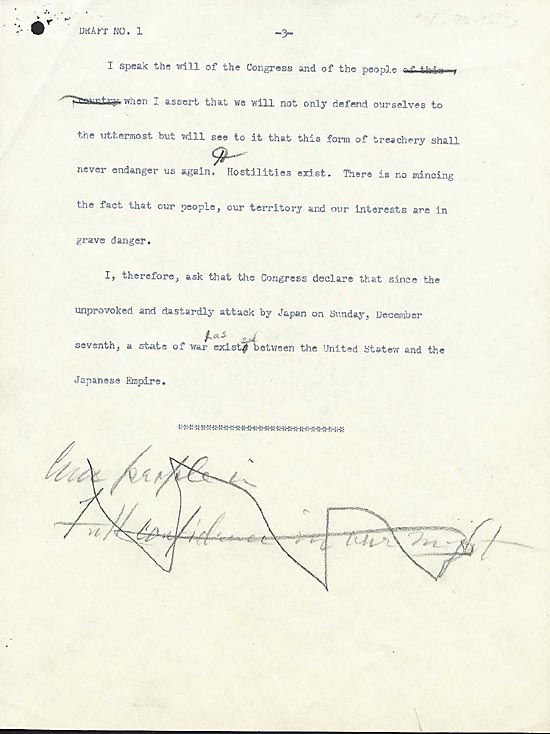
The three-paged draft of the speech, edited by Roosevelt

== See also ==
- Presidency of Franklin D. Roosevelt, first and second terms
- Timeline of World War II
- "Let Us Continue" — address by President Lyndon B. Johnson after the assassination of John F. Kennedy
- George W. Bush's address to the nation — after the September 11 attacks.

== Sources ==
Books and journals

- Alexander, Jeffrey C.; Eyerman, Ron; Giesen, Bernard; Smelser, Neil J.; Sztompka, Piotr (2004). Cultural Trauma and Collective Identity. University of California Press. ISBN 978-0-520-93676-8.
- Barta, Tony, ed. (1998). Screening The Past: Film and The Representation of History. Praeger. ISBN 978-0-275-95402-4.
- Brinkley, Alan (2000) [1999]. "Roosevelt, Franklin Delano (30 January 1882–12 April 1945), Thirty-Second President of the United States". American National Biography. Oxford University Press. doi:10.1093/anb/9780198606697.article.0600567.
- Brinkley, David (2003). Brinkley's Beat. New York: Knopf. ISBN 0-375-40644-1.
- Brown, Robert J. (1998). Manipulating the Ether : The Power of Broadcast Radio in Thirties America. McFarland & Company. ISBN 978-0-7864-0397-4.
- "Japan Enters the War: Statements in Washington, Tokyo and London". Bulletin of International News. 18 (25). Chatham House: 1960–1964. 1941. ISSN 2044-3986. JSTOR 25643163.
- Coker, Jeffrey W. (2005). Franklin D. Roosevelt : A Biography. Greenwood Publishing Group. ISBN 978-0-313-32337-9.
- Crowell, Laura (1958). "Word changes introduced Ad Libitum in five speeches by Franklin Delano Roosevelt". Speech Monographs. 25 (4). Taylor & Francis. doi:10.1080/03637755809375238. ISSN 0038-7169.
- Freidel, Frank (1990). Franklin D. Roosevelt: A Rendezvous With Destiny. Little, Brown and Company. ISBN 978-0-316-29260-3. OL 2193666M.
- Immerwahr, Daniel (2019). How to Hide an Empire – A Short History of the Greater United States. The Bodley Head. ISBN 978-1-84792-399-8.
- Jackson, Richard (2005). Writing the War on Terrorism – Language, Politics and Counter-terrorism. Manchester University Press. ISBN 978-0-7190-7121-8.
- Jasinski, James (2001). Sourcebook On Rhetoric : Key Concepts in Contemporary Rhetorical Studies. ISBN 978-0-7619-0504-2.
- Martel, Gordon (2004). The World War Two Reader. Routledge. ISBN 978-0-415-22402-4.
- McJimsey, George T. (2000). The Presidency of Franklin Delano Roosevelt. University Press of Kansas. ISBN 978-0-7006-1012-9.
- Onion, Rebecca (December 8, 2014). "FDR's First Draft of His "Day of Infamy" Speech, With His Notes". Slate.
- On War Against Japan – Franklin D. Roosevelt's "Day of Infamy" Address of 1941. National Archives and Records Administration. 1988. OCLC 17620457.
- Poulakos, John (1983). "Toward a Sophistic Definition of Rhetoric". Philosophy & Rhetoric. 16 (1). Pennsylvania State University Press: 35–48. ISSN 0031-8213. JSTOR 40237348.
- "FDR's 'Day of Infamy" Speech". Prologue. Vol. 33, no. 4. 2001 – via National Archives and Records Administration.
- Roosevelt, Franklin D. (1942). "The President's War Messages". Current History. University of California Press. JSTOR 45305940.
- Rosenberg, Emily S. (2003). A Date Which Will Live – Pearl Harbor in American Memory. Duke University Press. ISBN 978-0-8223-3206-0.
- Sickels, Robert (2004). The 1940s. Greenwood Publishing Group. ISBN 978-0-313-31299-1.
- Silberstein, Sandra (2002). War of Words – Language, Politics and 9/11. Routledge. ISBN 978-0-415-29047-0.
- Stelzner, Hermann G. (1966). "'War Message', December 8, 1941: An Approach to Language". Speech Monographs. 33 (4). Taylor & Francis: 419–437. doi:10.1080/03637756609375508. ISSN 0038-7169. S2CID 144612750.
- Tierney, Dominic (2007). "Pearl Harbor in Reverse". Journal of Cold War Studies. 9 (3). MIT Press: 49–77. doi:10.1162/jcws.2007.9.3.49. ISSN 1520-3972. JSTOR 26926046. S2CID 57560200.
- Webber, Elizabeth; Feinsilber, Mike (1999). Merriam–Webster's Dictionary of Allusions. Merriam-Webster. ISBN 978-0-87779-628-2.
- White, Geoffrey M. (2004). "National Subjects: September 11 and Pearl Harbor". American Ethnologist. 31 (3). Wiley: 293–310. doi:10.1525/ae.2004.31.3.293. JSTOR 3805359.
- White, Theodore H. (1965). The Making Of The President, 1964. Atheneum Books. p. 6. ISBN 978-0-451-61190-1. OL 5946573M.
- Yu, Lumeng (2005). "The Great Communicator: How FDR's Radio Speeches Shaped American History". The History Teacher. 39 (1). History of Education Society: 89–106. doi:10.2307/30036746. ISSN 0018-2745. JSTOR 30036746.

Online sources

- "The Latest: Trump Promises 'Orderly Transition' On January 20". Associated Press. January 7, 2021.
- Bush, George W. (2001). "Statement by the President in His Address to the Nation". White House.
- "Congress Declared War on Japs". New York Daily News. December 9, 1941 – via Newspapers.com.
- Dinneen, Joseph F. (November 24, 1963). "A Shock Like Pearl Harbor". The Boston Globe. p. 1.
- Sciolino, Elaine (March 11, 2004). "Spain Struggles to Absorb Worst Terrorist Attack in Its History". The New York Times.
- "United in Remembrance, Divided over Policies". Pew Research Center. September 1, 2011.
- Wolfowitz, Paul (2002). "Standup of U.S. Northern Command". United States Department of Defense. Archived from the original on August 24, 2006.
