= Declarations of war during World War II =

Animated map of the European theatre of war during WWII

This is a timeline of declarations of war during World War II.

A declaration of war is a formal act by which one nation goes to war against another. The declaration is usually the act of delivering a performative speech or the presentation of a signed document by an authorized party of a national government in order to create a state of war between two or more sovereign states. The official international protocol for declaring war was defined in The Hague Peace Conference of 1907 (or Hague II). For the diplomatic maneuvering behind these events, which led to hostilities between nations during World War II, see Diplomatic history of World War II.

== List of war declarations ==
Indicated in the table are the dates (during the preliminaries to, or during the course of, World War II), from which a de facto state of war existed between nations. The table shows the "Initiator Nation(s)" and the nation at which the aggression was aimed, or "Targeted Nation(s)". Events listed include those in which there were simple diplomatic breaking of relations that did not involve hostilities, as well as those involving overt declarations or acts of aggression. In rare cases, war between two nations occurred twice, with an intermittent period of peace. The list here does not include peace treaties or periods of any armistice.

Key to type (fourth column):
A	Attack without prior, formal declaration of war;
C	Declaration and/or attack without standard, formal procedure, sometimes preceded by a casus belli thus fait accompli;
U	State of war arrived at through use of ultimatum;
W	Formal declaration of war made.

Outbreaks of war between nations during World War II
Date	Initiator nation(s)	Targeted nation(s)	Type	Notes/comments	Document/event
1939-09-01	(Nazi Germany) Germany	Poland	A	German attack began at 4:44 a.m., Berlin and Warsaw time. Germany claimed that the attack was defensive, citing the Gleiwitz incident, which was actually a false flag attack.	Invasion
1939-09-01	Slovakia	Poland	A		Invasion
1939-09-03	United Kingdom; Australia; New Zealand; India; Southern Rhodesia; Tonga (Jordan) Transjordan	(Nazi Germany) Germany	U	At 11:15 a.m. London time, British PM, Neville Chamberlain publicly delivered his Ultimatum Speech. (Note: Included in the speech: "...This morning, the British Ambassador in Berlin handed the German Government a final note, stating that unless we heard from them by 11 O'clock that they were prepared at once to withdraw their troops from Poland a state of war would exist between us. I have to tell you now that no such undertaking has been received and that consequently this country is at war with Germany...") As the Statute of Westminster 1931 was not yet ratified by the parliaments of Australia and New Zealand, the British declaration of war on Germany also applied to those dominions. Tonga was not a British dominion, instead, as part of the British Commonwealth (a protected state of the UK and the British Empire) declared war separately, alongside Britain (since it administers their foreign affairs).	British declaration
1939-09-03	France; Morocco; Tunisia	(Nazi Germany) Germany	U	The French ultimatum to Germany expired a few hours after the British ultimatum, at 17:00.	French declaration
1939-09-04	Nepal	(Nazi Germany) Germany	W		Declaration
1939-09-06	South Africa	(Nazi Germany) Germany	W		Declaration
1939-09-10	Bahrain; Canada; Oman	(Nazi Germany) Germany	W	Canada's declaration several days after that of the United Kingdom is seen as a watershed moment in Canadian home rule and sovereignty. As for Bahrain, given its status as a protected state of the United Kingdom, it was technically at war as of Britain's declaration, this is an acknowledgement of the declaration of war by Britain (due to coercion by an advisor), Oman, under British influence, is coerced to participate in the war effort.	Bahrainian declaration Canadian declaration Muscatian and Omanian declaration
1939-09-17	Soviet Union	Poland	A		Invasion
1939-11-09	Kuwait	(Nazi Germany) Germany	W		Declaration
1939-11-30	Soviet Union	Finland	A		Invasion
1940-04-09	(Nazi Germany) Germany	Denmark; Norway	A		Invasion of Denmark; Invasion of Norway
1940-04-12	United Kingdom	Faroe Islands	A		Invasion
1940-05-10	(Nazi Germany) Germany	Belgium; Luxembourg; Netherlands	A/W	Date of the German offensive in the West, W from Belgium, Luxemburg and the Netherlands.	Belgium; Luxembourg; Netherlands
1940-05-10	United Kingdom	Iceland	A		Invasion
1940-06-10	Italy	France; United Kingdom	W		Declaration
1940-06-10	Canada	Italy	W		Declaration
1940-06-11	South Africa; Australia; New Zealand; France	Italy	W		South African declaration Australian declaration New Zealand's declaration French declaration
1940-07-03	United Kingdom	Vichy France	A	Vichy France cuts off diplomatic relations with the United Kingdom on 8 July 1940.	Attack
1940-09-09	Italy	Egypt	A	Egypt never formally declared war on Italy.	Invasion
1940-09-22	Japan	Vichy France	A	Japanese troops occupy French Indochina.	Invasion
1940-09-23	Free France; United Kingdom; Australia	Vichy France	A		Invasion
1940-10-??	Thailand	Vichy France	A		Franco-Thai War
1940-10-28	Italy	Greece	U	Italy invades Greece.	Invasion
1940-10-27	Free France	Vichy France	A	Free French Equatorial Africa invades Vichy French Gabon.	Invasion
1940-11-23	Belgium (in-exile)	Italy	W		Declaration
1941-02-05	Free France	Italy	A		Invasion
1941-04-06	(Nazi Germany) Germany	Greece	W		Invasion
1941-04-06	(Nazi Germany) Germany; Italy	Yugoslavia	A		Invasion
1941-04-07	Yugoslavia	Hungary	A	After the German invasion, bombing of Hungarian locations.	Invasion
1941-04-14	(Nazi Germany) Germany	Egypt	A	Egypt did not formally declare war until 1945.	Invasion
1941-04-24	Bulgaria	Greece; Yugoslavia	W	Bulgaria declares war on Greece and Yugoslavia.	Declaration
1941-05-02	United Kingdom	Iraq	A		Invasion
1941-06-08	Free France	(Nazi Germany) Germany	A		Invasion
1941-06-22	(Nazi Germany) Germany; Italy	Soviet Union	W	A timed declaration of war was given by Germany and by Italy at the time of the attack.	Invasion
1941-06-22/24	Romania	Soviet Union	A	On June 22, Romanian leader Ion Antonescu declared a "holy war" to reclaim ancestral lands and against Bolshevism in an appeal to the nation. The Romanian army began limited military operations. On June 24, Romania officially declared war on the Soviet Union.	Declaration
1941-06-22	Tuva	(Nazi Germany) Germany	W	Tuva was a client state of the Soviet Union. Part of the USSR from 1944.	Declaration
1941-06-25	Finland	Soviet Union	W	After the bombing of several Finnish locations, Finland recognized a state of war with the Soviet Union; third war between these nations.	Continuation War
1941-06-27	Hungary	Soviet Union	C	After the bombing of several Hungarian locations, the Hungarian military concluded a Soviet attack, the Government had decided the two countries were already belligerent, without the consent of the Parliament, in absence of the Regent.	Invasion
1941-08-25	Soviet Union; United Kingdom; Australia	Iran	A		Invasion
1941-12-05	United Kingdom; India	Finland; Romania; Hungary	W		Declaration
1941-12-06	Finland; Romania	United Kingdom	W		Declaration
1941-12-07	United Kingdom	Hungary	W	UK declaration of war from 1941-12-05 entered into force on 1941-12-07 1 minute after midnight.	Declaration
1941-12-07	Japan	United States; United Kingdom; Thailand	A	A formal message breaking off diplomatic talks was sent before but arrived after the attacks began, but this was not a declaration of war. See Attack on Pearl Harbor § Japanese declaration of war.	Declaration published after: Attack on Pearl Harbor; Invasion of Hong Kong; Invasion of Thailand
1941-12-07	Canada; Australia; New Zealand	Finland; Romania; Hungary	W		Declaration
1941-12-07	Panama; Yugoslavia (in-exile)	Japan	W		Declaration
1941-12-08	United Kingdom; United States; Canada; Australia; Costa Rica; Dominican Republic; El Salvador; Free France; Greece (in-exile); Haiti; Honduras; Netherlands (in-exile); New Zealand; Nicaragua; Philippines; Tonga	Japan	W	After the attack on Pearl Harbor, many countries declared a formal state of war on Japan.	British declaration United States declaration Canadian declaration Australian declaration Costa Rican declaration Dominican Republic's declaration Salvadoran declaration Haitian declaration Honduran declaration Dutch declaration New Zealand's declaration Nicaraguan declaration Philippine declaration Tongan declaration
1941-12-08	South Africa	Japan; Finland; Romania; Hungary	W		Declaration
1941-12-08	Mongolia	(Nazi Germany) Germany	W		Declaration
1941-12-08	Manchukuo	United States	W		Declaration
1941-12-08	Japan	(United Kingdom) British Malaya	A		Invasion of Malaya; Attack on Singapore
1941-12-09	Cuba; Guatemala	Japan	W		Cuban declaration Guatemalan declaration
1941-12-09	China	(Nazi Germany) Germany; Italy; Japan	W	China and Japan had been at undeclared war since 1937.	Second Sino-Japanese war Declaration
1941-12-10	Korea (government in exile)	Japan	W	Many Korean armies such as the Korean Liberation Army had already been fighting Japan in the Second Sino-Japanese War, although a formal declaration was not made until the attack on Pearl Harbor.	Declaration
1941-12-11	(Nazi Germany) Germany; Italy	United States	W		German declaration Italian declaration
1941-12-11	United States; Cuba; Costa Rica; Dominican Republic; Guatemala; Nicaragua	(Nazi Germany) Germany; Italy	W		United States declaration of war on Germany (1941); United States declaration of war on Italy
1941-12-11	Netherlands (in-exile)	Italy	W		Declaration
1941-12-11	Poland (in-exile)	Japan	W	The Japanese government did not declare war on Poland because—pursuant to a decision made on October 6, 1941—Japan had withdrawn its recognition of the Polish government-in-exile and ceased to regard the Polish state as an existing entity. Any response by Japan to the Polish declaration would have been tantamount to continuing to recognize the Polish state and undermining the territorial gains of its German ally. (Note: The state of war was not recognized by, or formally ended until 1957, when Japan concluded a separate peace treaty in order to establish diplomatic relations with the Polish People's Republic. The Polish government-in-exile never recognized the peace treaty and remained in a technical state of war with Japan until it disbanded in 1991, following the fall of communism in Poland.)	Declaration
1941-12-12	Romania; Bulgaria; Slovakia	United States; United Kingdom	W		Romanian declaration Bulgarian declaration
1941-12-12	Haiti; El Salvador; Panama	(Nazi Germany) Germany; Italy	W		Declaration
1941-12-12	Australia; Netherlands	Portugal	A	Portugal maintained neutrality throughout World War II.	Invasion
1941-12-13	United Kingdom; New Zealand; South Africa	Bulgaria	W		British declaration New Zealand's declaration South African declaration
1941-12-13	Honduras	(Nazi Germany) Germany; Italy	W		Declaration
1941-12-13	Italy	Cuba; Guatemala	W		Declaration
1941-12-14	Independent State of Croatia	United States; United Kingdom	W		Declaration
1941-12-15	Hungary	United States	C	The Prime Minister informed the U.S. ambassador without approval of the Parliament and the Regent, but initially denied it would mean "war" in fact, however two days later he declared it means the two countries became belligerent. As the ambassador refused to accept the verbal form of this act, the next day the Prime Minister in written reinforced it.	Declaration
1941-12-16	Czechoslovakia (in-exile)	(Nazi Germany) Germany; Italy; Finland; Romania; Hungary; Japan; Bulgaria; Independent State of Croatia; Slovakia	W	Czechoslovakia declares war on all countries at war with the United States of America, Great Britain and the Union of Soviet Socialist Republics.	Declaration
1941-12-16	Japan	(Raj of Sarawak) Sarawak; North Borneo; Brunei	A		Invasion
1941-12-19	Nicaragua	Romania; Hungary; Bulgaria	W		Declaration
1941-12-19	Romania	Nicaragua	W	Out of the Axis countries only Romania reciprocated, declaring war on Nicaragua on the same day.	Declaration
1941-12-20	Belgium (in-exile)	Japan	W		Declaration
1941-12-24	Haiti	Romania; Hungary; Bulgaria	W		Declaration
1941-12-24	Romania	Haiti	W	Out of the Axis countries only Romania reciprocated, declaring war on Haiti on the same day.	Declaration
1941-12-25	Greece (in-exile)	Japan	W		Declaration
1942-01-01	United Nations	Axis powers	W	Declared during Arcadia Conference.	Declaration
1942-01-06	Australia	Bulgaria	W		Declaration
1942-01-25	Thailand	United Kingdom; United States	A		Declaration
1942-01-25	United Kingdom; New Zealand; South Africa	Thailand	W		British declaration New Zealand's declaration South African declaration
1942-02-19	Japan	Portugal	A	Portugal maintained neutrality throughout World War II.	Invasion
1942-03-02	Australia	Thailand	W		Declaration
1942-05-05	South Africa; Netherlands (in-exile); Poland	Vichy France	A		Invasion
1942-05-05	United Kingdom; Northern Rhodesia; Southern Rhodesia; South Africa (Tanganyika Territory) Tanganyika; Belgian Congo	Vichy France; Japan	A		Invasion
1942-05-22	Mexico	(Nazi Germany) Germany; Italy; Japan	W		Declaration
1942-06-05	United States	Hungary; Romania; Bulgaria	W		Declaration of War on Hungary; Declaration of War on Romania; Declaration of war on Bulgaria
1942-06-13	Iroquoia	(Nazi Germany) Germany; Italy; Japan	W	Having never made peace with Germany from the First World War, Haudenosaunee became the only Native American state to officially declare war on the Axis powers separately from the United States. Other Native American nations issued declarations or declared war de facto alongside the United States as their tribal citizens enlisted in the Armed Forces).	Declaration
1942-08-22	Brazil	(Nazi Germany) Germany; Italy	W		Declaration
1942-11-08	United States; Canada	Vichy France	A		Invasion
1942-11-10	(Nazi Germany) Germany; Italy	Vichy France	A		Invasion
1942-11-12	(Nazi Germany) Germany	Tunisia	A	German invasion via airlifting several divisions in reaction to Operation Torch, swiftly occupying Tunis and the eastern part of the country, and capturing the western portions after French Tunisian resistance before the allies reached the Tunisian border. In the resulting Tunisian campaign, the Allies finally defeated the Axis forces in Africa.	Invasion
1942-12-14	Ethiopia	(Nazi Germany) Germany; Italy; Japan	W	On 3 October 1935, Italy invaded Ethiopia without a formal declaration of war. In response to the Italian invasion, Ethiopia declared war on Italy. Most of Ethiopia was occupied by Italy in 1936, however parts of Ethiopia remained under the control of the Ethiopian Patriots Movement, which begun its guerrilla war against the occupying Italian forces the day Addis Ababa fell in May 1936. In May 1941, Addis Ababa was liberated by the Gideon Force, restoring sovereignty to Ethiopia.	Second Italo-Ethiopian War; Declaration
1943-01-09	Reorganized National Government of China	United States; United Kingdom	W		Declaration
1943-01-17	Iraq	(Nazi Germany) Germany (Fascist Italy) Italy; Japan	W		Declaration
1943-04-07	Bolivia	Axis powers	W	Bolivia officially joined the Allies on 7 April 1943. Shortly after war was declared, the President, Enrique Peñaranda, was overthrown in a coup. Bolivian mines supplied needed tin to the Allies, but no troops or warplanes were sent overseas. Bolivians remained confident their geographic isolation would protect them from the war.	Declaration
1943-08-01	State of Burma	United States; United Kingdom	W		Declaration
1943-09-08	(Nazi Germany) Germany	Italy; Albania	A	After Italy's capitulation to the Allied powers, Germany swiftly invaded both Italy and Italian-controlled territories (such as Albania, an Italian satellite state) to preempt a possible Allied intervention.	Operation Achse; German occupation of Albania
1943-09-09	Iran	(Nazi Germany) Germany	W		Declaration
1943-10-13	Italy	(Nazi Germany) Germany	W	Italy had changed sides after the fall of Mussolini. The Declaration of War was given by Pietro Badoglio to the German ambassador in Madrid.	Declaration
1943-11-26	Colombia	(Nazi Germany) Germany	W	See Colombia during World War II.	Declaration
1944-01-17	Free France	Italian Social Republic	A		Invasion
1944-01-27	Liberia	(Nazi Germany) Germany; Japan	W		Declaration
1944-06-06	France	(Nazi Germany) Germany	A		Invasion
1944-07-25	France	Japan	A		Invasion
1944-08-25	Romania	(Nazi Germany) Germany	W	Romania switched sides.	Declaration
1944-09-05	Soviet Union	Bulgaria	W		Declaration
1944-09-07	Hungary	Romania	W		Declaration
1944-09-07	Romania	Hungary	W		Declaration
1944-09-08	Bulgaria	(Nazi Germany) Germany	W	Bulgaria switched sides.	Declaration
1944-09-15	(Nazi Germany) Germany	Finland	A		Lapland War
1944-09-23	Second Philippine Republic	United States; United Kingdom	W		Declaration
1944-12-28	Hungary	Germany	W	The Provisional National Government, which had been established under Soviet protection in the city of Debrecen, declared war on Germany. The German-backed Arrow Cross regime was still at war with the Soviet Union and its troops were still in action. In January 1945, the Provisional National Government signed an armistice with the Allies, where it confirmed the declaration of war on Germany and obliged itself to form military forces loyal to the Allies.	Declaration
1945-02-02	Ecuador	(Nazi Germany) Germany; Japan	W		Declaration
1945-02-07	Paraguay	(Nazi Germany) Germany; Japan	W		Declaration
1945-02-12	Peru	(Nazi Germany) Germany; Japan	W		Declaration
1945-02-15	Venezuela; Uruguay	(Nazi Germany) Germany; Japan	W		Venezuelan declaration Uruguayan declaration
1945-02-23	Turkey	(Nazi Germany) Germany; Japan	W		Declaration
1945-02-24	Egypt	(Nazi Germany) Germany; Japan	W		Declaration
1945-02-26	Syria; Lebanon	(Nazi Germany) Germany; Japan	W		Declaration
1945-02-28	Saudi Arabia	(Nazi Germany) Germany	W		Declaration
1945-03-01	Saudi Arabia	Japan	W		Declaration
1945-03-01	Iran	Japan	W	Iran declared war on Japan retroactive to the previous day (Feb. 28, 1945).	Declaration
1945-03-03	Finland	(Nazi Germany) Germany	W	Finland declared war on Germany retroactive to Sept. 15, 1944 following terms of 1944 Moscow Armistice.	Lapland War
1945-03-07	Romania	Japan	W		Declaration
1945-03-27	Argentina	(Nazi Germany) Germany; Japan	W		Declaration
1945-04-11	Chile	Japan	W	Chile cut off diplomatic relations with Germany, Italy and Japan on 20 January 1943.	Declaration
1945-06-07	Brazil	Japan	W		Declaration
1945-07-09	Norway (in-exile)	Japan	W	Norwegian government-in-exile announced that it had declared war on Japan on December 7, 1941.	Declaration
1945-07-14	Italy	Japan	W		Declaration
1945-08-08	Soviet Union	Japan	W	Last outbreak of war of the Second World War.	Soviet–Japanese War
1945-08-10	Mongolia	Japan	W	W (de jure) A (de facto 1945-08-09) War declared 24 hours after crossing the border with Soviet troops.	Soviet Invasion of Manchuria; Mongolia in World War II

== See also ==
- Diplomatic history of World War II
- Allies of World War II
- Axis powers: German Instrument of Surrender and Surrender of Japan
- Declarations of war during World War I

== Bibliography ==
- Boog, Horst; Förster, Jürgen; Hoffmann, Joachim; Klink, Ernst; Müller, Rolf-Dieter; Ueberschär, Gerd R. (1998). Germany and the Second World War. Vol. 4. Oxford: Clarendon Press.
- Prange, Gordon William; Goldstein, Donald M.; Dillon, Katherine V. (1981). At Dawn We Slept: The Untold Story of Pearl Harbor. McGraw-Hill. ISBN 0-07-050669-8.
