= Turkish declaration of war on Germany and Japan =

1945 event of World War II

On 23 February 1945 Turkey declared war on Nazi Germany and the Empire of Japan. It was proposed in a speech made by Turkish Prime Minister Şükrü Saracoğlu during a special session. The resolution passed unanimously by the parliament and was published on Official Gazette next day. Turkey became a party to the Declaration by United Nations at the same time.

== Text of the declaration ==
Friends, in the last years of human history, some people have sprung up. They adorned their flags with nonsense like the superior race and living space. Not only that, they started to subjugate small and innocent nations one by one by violating all the rules of right and justice, and they turned the world into a black dungeon. In the face of this scene, the great powers, trying to save humanity, civilization, freedom and democracy, took up arms one after the other and gave the hope of living to the world again thanks to great, heavy and long sacrifices.

From the first moments of danger, the Republic of Turkey has put its word, weapon and heart on the side of the democratic nations and has moved in the same direction with the decisions it has taken as the Parliament and the Government until today. Today, we want to take one more step and join those who want to save humanity, civilization, freedom, independence, democracy and punish the perpetrators of war with violence, and this time officially fill the place that we have occupied for a long time among the war partners. In order to achieve this, we want to declare war on Germany and Japan in accordance with our national interests as well as the interests of the world and humanity.

Friends, the historical decisions taken by the Grand Assembly have always been very beneficial and auspicious decisions, and have been appreciated by the whole Turkish nation and the whole world. Today, we are faced with a historic decision. Your government is sincerely convinced that the positive decision to be taken for this matter will provide great benefits to the Turkish nation.

— Şükrü Saracoğlu, Prime Minister

== See also ==
- Declarations of war during World War II
- Diplomatic history of World War II
