= French declaration of war on Germany (1939) =

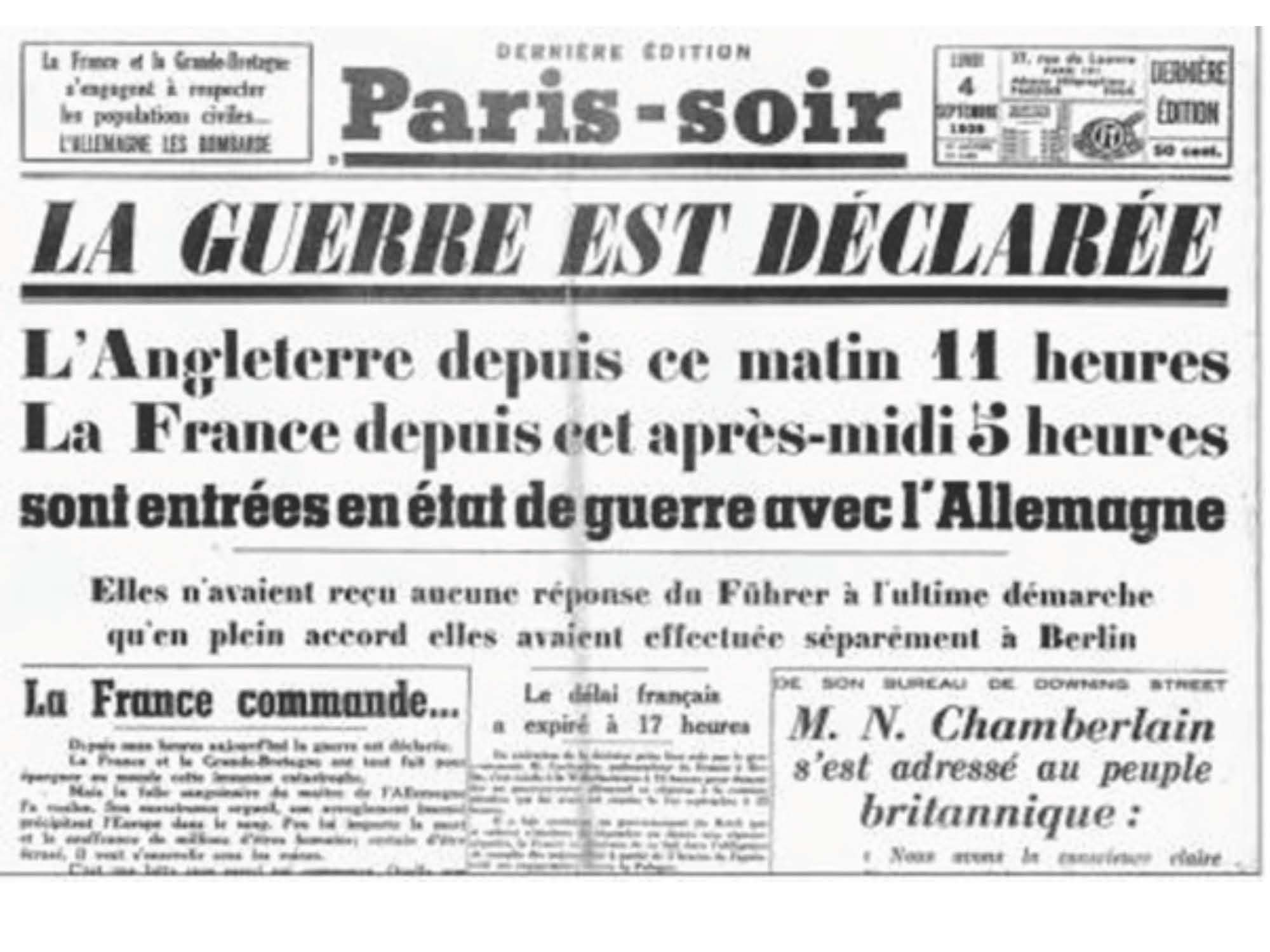
Front page of Paris-soir announcing France's declaration of war on Germany, 3 September 1939

On 3 September 1939—two days after the German invasion of Poland—France declared war on Nazi Germany according to its defensive treaty with Poland, when France's ultimatum to Germany, issued the previous day, expired at 17:00. This occurred hours after the United Kingdom declaration of war on Germany.

== Text of the declaration ==
Women and Men of France,

Since daybreak on September 1, Poland has been the victim of the most brutal and most cynical of aggressions. Her frontiers have been violated. Her cities are being bombed. Her army is heroically resisting the invader.

The responsibility for the blood that is being shed falls entirely upon the Hitler Government. The fate of peace was in Hitler's hands. He chose war. France and England have made countless efforts to safeguard peace. This very morning they made a further urgent intervention in Berlin in order to address to the German Government a last appeal to reason and request it to stop hostilities and to open peaceful negotiations.

Germany met us with a refusal. She had already refused to reply to all the men of goodwill who recently raised their voices in favour of the peace of the world. She therefore desires the destruction of Poland, so as to be able to dominate Europe quickly and to enslave France.

In rising against the most frightful of tyrannies, in honoring our word, we fight to defend our soil, our homes, our liberties. I am conscious of having worked unremittingly against the war until the last minute.

I greet with emotion and affection our young soldiers, who now go forth to perform the sacred task which we ourselves did perform before them. They can have full confidence in their chiefs, who are worthy of those who have previously led France to victory.

The cause of France is identical with that of Righteousness. It is the cause of all peaceful and free nations. It will be victorious.

Men and women of France!

We are waging war because it has been thrust on us. Every one of us is at his post, on the soil of France, on that land of liberty where respect of human dignity finds one of its last refuges. You will all cooperate, with a profound feeling of union and brotherhood, for the salvation of the country.

Vive la France!

— Édouard Daladier, President of the Council of Ministers, Appeal to the Nation,

== See also ==
- British declaration of war on Germany (1939)
- Declarations of war during World War II
- Diplomatic history of World War II
