= United States declaration of war on Italy =

1941 US congressional resolution

Declaration of state of war with Italy
- Long title: Joint Resolution Declaring that a state of war exists between the Government of Italy and the Government and the people of the United States and making provision to prosecute the same
- Enacted by: the 77th United States Congress
- Effective: December 11, 1941

Citations
- Public law: Pub. L. 77–332
- Statutes at Large: 55 Stat. 797

Legislative history
- Introduced in the Senate as S.J.Res.120

On December 11, 1941, in response to the Italian declaration of war on the United States, four days following the Japanese surprise attack on Pearl Harbor, and three days after the United States declaration of war on the Empire of Japan, the United States Congress passed the Joint Resolution Declaring That a State of War Exists Between The Government of Italy and the Government and the People of the United States and Making Provisions to Prosecute the Same, thereby declaring war on Italy. It also declared war upon Germany that same day. The vote was 90–0 in the Senate and 399–0 in the House.

== Text of the declaration ==
Whereas the Government of Italy has formally declared war against the Government and the people of the United States of America. Therefore, be it resolved by the Senate and House of Representatives of the United States of America in Congress assembled, That the state of war between the United States and the Government of Italy which has thus been thrust upon the United States is hereby formally declared; and the President is hereby authorized and directed to employ the entire naval and military forces of the United States and the resources of the Government to carry on war against the Government of Italy; and, to bring the conflict to a successful termination, all of the resources of the country are hereby pledged by the Congress of the United States.

== See also ==
- Arcadia Conference
- Declarations of war during World War II
- Diplomatic history of World War II
- Kellogg–Briand Pact
- United States declaration of war on Japan
- United States declaration of war on Germany (1941)
