= United States declaration of war on Germany (1941) =

Declaration of state of war with Germany
- Long title: Joint Resolution "Declaring that a state of war exists between the Government of Germany and the Government and the people of the United States and making provision to prosecute the same"
- Enacted by: the 77th United States Congress
- Effective: December 11, 1941

Citations
- Public law: Pub. L. 77–331
- Statutes at Large: 55 Stat. 796

Legislative history
- Introduced in the Senate as S.J.Res.119

On December 11, 1941, the 77th United States Congress declared war on Germany (Pub. L. 77–331, Sess. 1, ch. 564, 55 Stat. 796), hours after Germany declared war on the United States after the attack on Pearl Harbor by the Empire of Japan. The vote was approved unanimously by both houses of Congress; 88–0 in the Senate and 393–0 in the House.

== Text ==
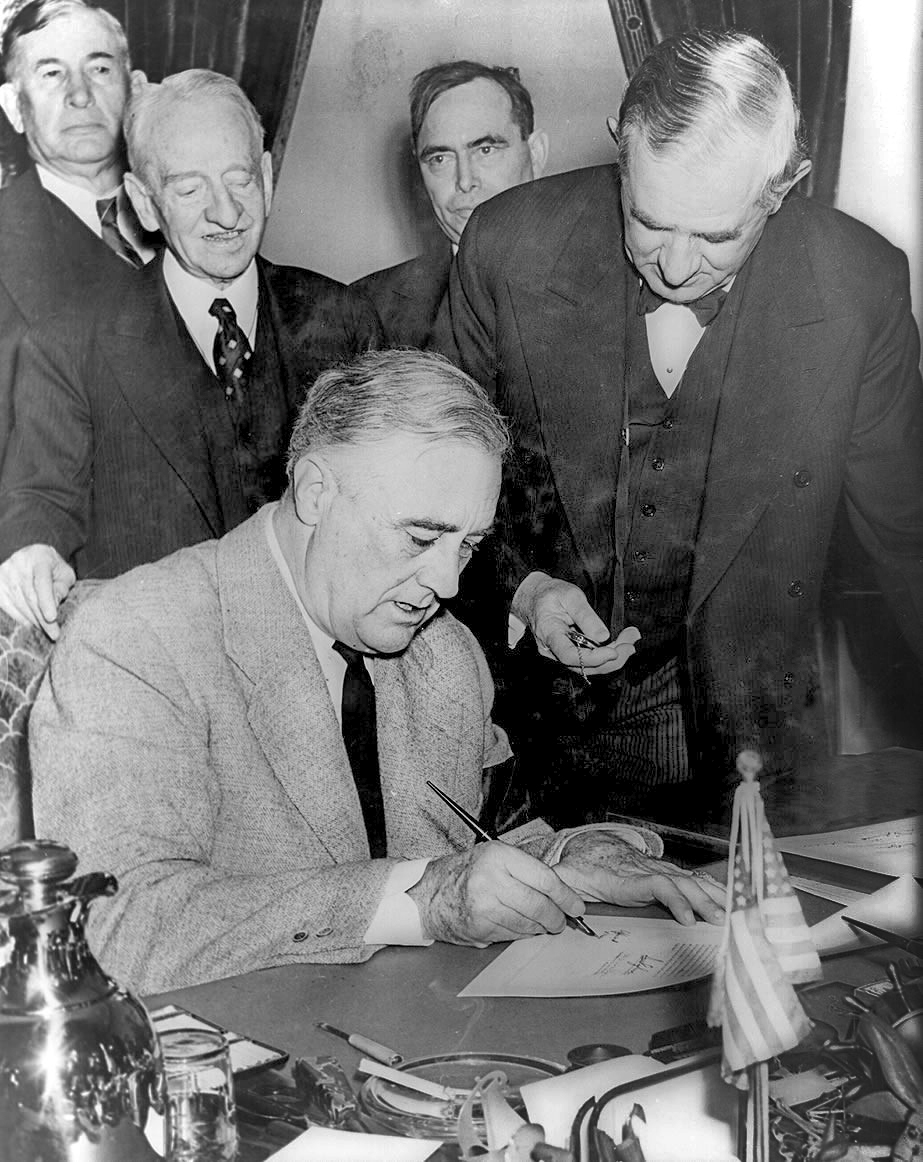
President Roosevelt signing the declaration of war against Germany. Senator Tom Connally stands by holding a watch to record the exact time of the declaration.

Seventy-Seventh Congress of the United States of America; At the First Session Begun and held at the City of Washington, on Friday, the third day of January, 1941.

JOINT RESOLUTION Declaring That a State of War Exists Between The Government of Germany and the Government and the People of the United States and Making Provisions To Prosecute The Same

Whereas the Government of Germany has formally declared war against the Government and the people of the United States of America:

Therefore be it

Resolved by the Senate and House of Representatives of the United States of America in Congress assembled, That the state of war between the United States and the Government of Germany which has thus been thrust upon the United States is hereby formally declared; and the President is hereby authorized and directed to employ the entire naval and military forces of the United States and the resources of the Government to carry on war against the Government of Germany; and, to bring the conflict to a successful termination, all of the resources of the country are hereby pledged by the Congress of the United States.

(Signed) Sam Rayburn, Speaker of the House of Representatives

(Signed) H. A. Wallace, Vice President of the United States and President of the Senate

Approved December 11, 1941 3:05 PM E.S.T.

(Signed) Franklin D. Roosevelt

== See also ==
- Arcadia Conference
- Declarations of war during World War II
- Diplomatic history of World War II
- German declaration of war against the United States
- Kellogg–Briand Pact
- United Kingdom declaration of war on Germany (1939)
- United States declaration of war on Germany (1917)
- United States declaration of war on Italy
- United States declaration of war on Japan
