= British declaration of war on Germany (1939) =

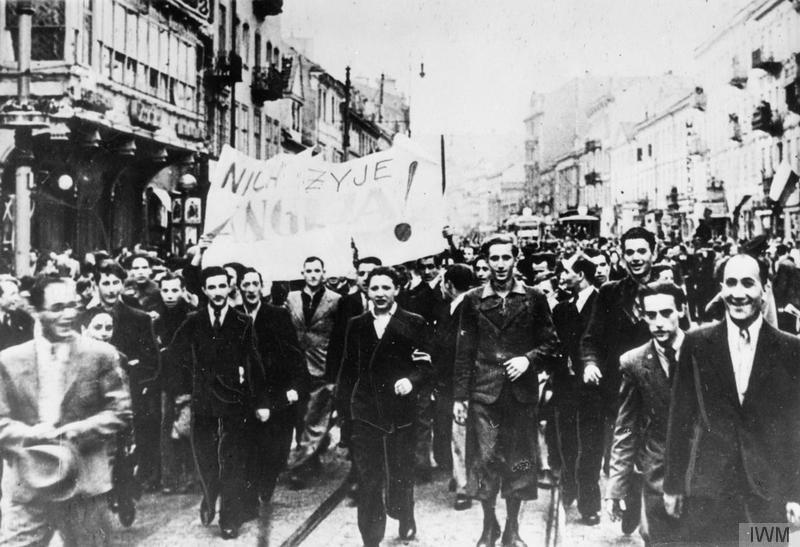
Poles marching in Warsaw, after Britain declared war on Germany, during the (German) invasion of Poland. Banner reads "Long Live England".

Declaration of war
Neville Chamberlain announces war with Germany, broadcast by the BBC Home Service at 11.15 am BST on 3 September 1939.

On Sunday 3 September 1939, the United Kingdom declared war on Germany—two days after the German invasion of Poland. France also declared war on Germany later the same day.

== Historical context ==
At the conclusion of the First World War, the German Empire signed the Armistice of 11 November 1918 as an end to hostilities with France, Britain, and the United States during the convoluted German revolution of 1918–1919, which began on 29 October 1918.

Negotiations between the Allied powers regarding post-war Europe started on 18 January 1919 in the Salle de l'Horloge at the French Foreign Ministry on the Quai d'Orsay in Paris. Seventy delegates from 27 nations participated in the negotiations. The opposing nations of the German Empire and the Austro-Hungarian Empire were excluded from the negotiations. At first a "Council of Ten" comprising two delegates each from Britain, France, the United States, Italy and Japan met officially to decide the peace terms. It became the "Big Four" when Japan dropped out and the top person from each of the other four nations met in 145 closed sessions to make all the major decisions to be ratified by the entire assembly. In June 1919, the Allies declared that war would resume if the German government did not sign the treaty they had agreed to among themselves. The government headed by Philipp Scheidemann was unable to agree on a common position, and Scheidemann himself resigned rather than agree to sign the treaty. Gustav Bauer, the head of the new government, sent a telegram stating his intention to sign the treaty if certain articles were withdrawn, including articles 227, 230 and 231. In response, the Allies issued an ultimatum stating that Germany would have to accept the treaty or face an invasion of Allied forces across the Rhine within 24 hours. On 23 June 1919, Bauer capitulated and sent a second telegram with a confirmation that a German delegation would arrive shortly to sign the treaty.

On 28 June 1919, Germany signed the Treaty of Versailles, a peace treaty which ended the formal state of war and imposed various punitive measures upon Germany, including military restrictions, loss of territory and colonies, war reparations, and effective acceptance of blame for the initiation of hostilities in World War I. Germany was forced to borrow money from the United States and others to pay its war debt, imposed by the Treaty of Versailles. In the early 1920s a period of hyperinflation made the Mark almost worthless. In January 1922, one US dollar was worth 191 Marks, but by November of the same year it was equal to 4,200,000,000 Marks.

At the time of the armistice, in the first stages of the German Revolution, power had passed provisionally to leaders of the Social Democratic Party, the abdication of the Emperor of Germany was announced on 9 November 1918, and what became known as the Weimar Republic was subsequently established through a constituent national assembly. The transition from monarchy to republic was difficult, and many in the new Republic were not supportive of the democratic system of government. The officer class gave little support to the Republic, and both they and large sectors of the civilian elite. With considerable co-operation from both the government and foreign powers then hostile to the western powers, including Soviet Russia, the German elite worked to evade the arms limitations imposed at Versailles in various ways.

On 30 January 1933, Adolf Hitler was appointed Chancellor of the Reich following a contentious election. Under Hitler's leadership, the Reichstag turned the government into an effective dictatorship under Hitler's oversight on 21 March 1933 with the passage of the Enabling Act of 1933, and the economic hardships were significantly diminished via implementation of new economic and social policies. Under Hitler, violations of Versailles' military limitations became increasingly blatant, culminating in these provisions of the treaty being openly ignored with the resumption of conscription in 1935 and remilitarization of the Rhineland in 1936. After five years in power, Hitler annexed Austria, former component of the Austro-Hungarian Empire (allies of the former German Empire), into Germany, despite such an act (specifically, "prohibition on the merging of Austria with Germany without the consent of the League of Nations") being banned by both the Treaty of Saint-Germain-en-Laye and the Treaty of Versailles. In early November 1938, the First Vienna Award was signed, allowing Germany to seize the Sudetenland, a German-speaking area of Czechoslovakia which had been a part of the German Empire-allied Austro-Hungarian Empire. Soon after, Germany invaded the rest of Czechoslovakia and also gained Memelland (part of the former German Empire from 1871 to 1920) through the 1939 German ultimatum to Lithuania.

Two Western powers, the United Kingdom and France, gave guarantees to Poland that they would declare war if Polish independence came under threat, as presented in a statement to the House of Commons by the British Prime Minister Neville Chamberlain on 31 March 1939 (formalized by the British on 6 April 1939; not ratified until 4 September 1939 by the French):

... in the event of any action which clearly threatened Polish independence, and which the Polish Government accordingly considered it vital to resist with their national forces, His Majesty's Government would feel themselves bound at once to lend the Polish Government all support in their power. They have given the Polish Government an assurance to this effect. I may add that the French Government have authorised me to make it plain that they stand in the same position in this matter as do His Majesty's Government.

== Declaration ==
The state of war was announced to the British public in a radio broadcast at 11:00 by the prime minister Neville Chamberlain.

I am speaking to you from the Cabinet Room at 10, Downing Street.
This morning the British Ambassador in Berlin handed the German Government a final Note stating that unless we heard from them by 11 o'clock that they were prepared at once to withdraw their troops from Poland a state of war would exist between us. I have to tell you now that no such undertaking has been received, and that consequently this country is at war with Germany.
You can imagine what a bitter blow it is to me that all my long struggle to win peace has failed. Yet I cannot believe that there is anything more or anything different that I could have done and that would have been more successful.
Up to the very last it would have been quite possible to have arranged a peaceful and honourable settlement between Germany and Poland. But Hitler would not have it. He had evidently made up his mind to attack Poland whatever happened, and although he now says he put forward reasonable proposals which were rejected by the Poles, that is not a true statement.
The proposals were never shown to the Poles, nor to us, and, though they were announced in a German broadcast on Thursday night, Hitler did not wait to hear comments on them, but ordered his troops to cross the Polish frontier. His action shows convincingly that there is no chance of expecting that this man will ever give up his practice of using force to gain his will. He can only be stopped by force.
We and France are to-day, in fulfillment of our obligations, going to the aid of Poland, who is so bravely resisting this wicked and unprovoked attack upon her people. We have a clear conscience. We have done all that any country could do to establish peace, but a situation in which no word given by Germany's ruler could be trusted and no people or country could feel themselves safe had become intolerable. And now that we have resolved to finish it, I know that you will all play your part with calmness and courage.

== After the declaration of war ==
The Royal Navy initiated a naval blockade of Germany on 4 September. Although Britain and France honoured these guarantees by declaring war two days after Germany's invasion of Poland on 1 September 1939, and the dominions of the British Empire quickly followed suit, so little practical assistance was given to Poland, which was soon defeated, that in its early stages the war declared by Britain and France was described as a "Phoney War".

Further, neither the British Empire nor the French ever declared war upon the Soviet Union, which invaded Poland on 17 September 1939 (16 days after Nazi Germany invaded from the West). The Polish ambassador in London, Edward Bernard Raczyński, contacted the British Foreign Office to point out that clause 1(b) of the agreement, which concerned an "aggression by a European power" on Poland, should apply to the Soviet invasion. Foreign Secretary Lord Halifax responded that the obligation of British Government towards Poland arising out of the Anglo-Polish Agreement was restricted to Germany, according to the first clause of the secret protocol. The Soviet Union held sway over the former Polish territory at the war's conclusion, having become a part of the Allies in the course of World War II. At the insistence of Joseph Stalin, the post-war Yalta Conference in 1945 sanctioned the formation of a new provisional pro-Communist coalition government in Moscow, which ignored the Polish government-in-exile based in London.

== See also ==
- Canadian declaration of war on Germany
- Declarations of war by Great Britain and the United Kingdom
- Declarations of war during World War II
- Diplomatic history of World War II
- French declaration of war on Germany (1939)
- Military history of the United Kingdom during World War II
- British declaration of war on Japan
