= Japanese declaration of war on the United States and the British Empire =

The Imperial edict of declaration of war by the Empire of Japan on the United States and the British Empire (Kyūjitai: 米國及英國ニ對スル宣戰ノ詔書) was published on 8 December 1941 (Japan time; 7 December in the US), 7.5 hours after Japanese forces attacked the United States at Pearl Harbor and British forces in Malaya, Singapore, and Hong Kong. The declaration of war was printed on the front page of all Japanese newspapers' evening editions on December 8. The document was subsequently printed again on the eighth day of each month throughout the war (until Japan surrendered in 1945), to re-affirm the resolve for the war.

== Background ==
The document declares the war against the United States and the British Empire, discusses their presumed disruptive actions against Japan's foreign policy and states that all avenues for averting war have been exhausted from the Government of Japan. Japan had invaded much of East Asia to create what they called the "Greater East Asia Co-Prosperity Sphere", now largely viewed as a pretext for imperialism. In response, the US imposed an oil embargo on Japan in August 1941 to stop aiding their aggression in Asia and to contain Japanese actions. There was also an embargo on steel. Japan saw this as a hostile and provocative act, and retaliated with the bombing of Pearl Harbor and the declarations of war on the US and the British Empire.

== Text of the document ==
Below is the text to the declaration of the war with the boldened texts released in the name of the Emperor of Japan:

Imperial rescript

We, by the grace of Heaven, Emperor of Japan, seated on the throne occupied by the same dynasty from time immemorial, enjoin upon ye, Our loyal and brave subjects:

We hereby declare War on the United States of America and the British Empire. The men and officers of Our Army and Navy shall do their utmost in prosecuting the war. Our public servants of various departments shall perform faithfully and diligently their respective duties; the entire nation with a united will shall mobilise their total strength so that nothing will miscarry in the attainment of Our war aims.

To ensure the stability of East Asia and to contribute to world peace is the far-sighted policy which was formulated by Our Great Illustrious Imperial Grandsire [Emperor Meiji] and Our Great Imperial Sire succeeding Him [Emperor Taishō], and which We lay constantly to heart. To cultivate friendship among nations and to enjoy prosperity in common with all nations, has always been the guiding principle of Our Empire's foreign policy. It has been truly unavoidable and far from Our wishes that Our Empire has been brought to cross swords with America and Britain. More than four years have passed since China, failing to comprehend the true intentions of Our Empire, and recklessly courting trouble, disturbed the peace of East Asia and compelled Our Empire to take up arms. Although there has been reestablished the National Government of China, with which Japan had effected neighborly intercourse and cooperation, the regime which has survived in Chungking, relying upon American and British protection, still continues its fratricidal opposition. Eager for the realisation of their inordinate ambition to dominate the Orient, both America and Britain, giving support to the Chungking regime, have aggravated the disturbances in East Asia. Moreover these two Powers, inducing other countries to follow suit, increased military preparations on all sides of Our Empire to challenge Us. They have obstructed by every means Our peaceful commerce and finally resorted to a direct severance of economic relations, menacing gravely the existence of Our Empire. Patiently have We waited and long have We endured, in the hope that Our government might retrieve the situation in peace. But Our adversaries, showing not the least spirit of conciliation, have unduly delayed a settlement; and in the meantime they have intensified the economic and political pressure to compel thereby Our Empire to submission. This trend of affairs, would, if left unchecked, not only nullify Our Empire's efforts of many years for the sake of the stabilisation of East Asia, but also endanger the very existence of Our nation. The situation being such as it is, Our Empire, for its existence and self-defense has no other recourse but to appeal to arms and to crush every obstacle in its path.

The hallowed spirits of Our Imperial Ancestors guarding Us from above, We rely upon the loyalty and courage of Our subjects in Our confident expectation that the task bequeathed by Our forefathers will be carried forward and that the sources of evil will be speedily eradicated and an enduring peace immutably established in East Asia, preserving thereby the glory of Our Empire.

In witness whereof, we have hereunto set Our hand and caused the Grand Seal of the Empire to be affixed at the Imperial Palace, Tokyo, this seventh day of the 12th month of the 15th year of Shōwa, corresponding to the 2,602nd year from the accession to the throne of Emperor Jimmu.

(Released by the Board of Information, December 8, 1941. Japan Times & Advertiser)

== See also ==
- Declarations of war during World War II
- Diplomatic history of World War II
