= Maina-Miriam Munsky =

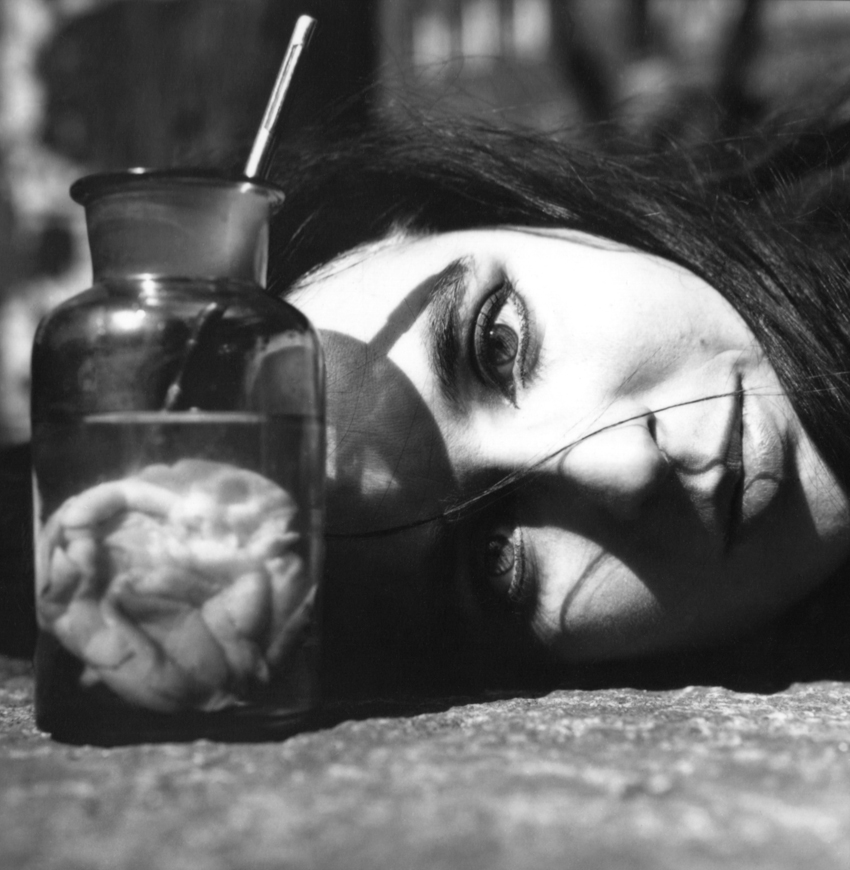
- Maina-Miriam Munsky Erhard Wehrmann, Berlin 1977
- Born: Meina Munsky; 24 September 1943; Wolfenbüttel, Germany
- Died: 26 October 1999 (aged 56); Berlin, Germany
- Education: Hochschule für Bildende Künste Braunschweig; Accademia di Belle Arti di Firenze (Florence)
- Occupations: Artist (New Realism)
- Spouse: Peter Sorge
- Children: Daniel Ben Sorge
- Parent(s): Oskar Munsky (1910-1947); Gertrud Schmidt (1912-1986)

Maina-Miriam Munsky (born Meina Munsky: 24 September 1943 - 26 October 1999) was a German New Realist artist. She came to prominence in West Berlin during the 1970s with a series of "larger than life" ("großformatige") paintings of births, abortions and surgical procedures.

== Biography ==
=== Provenance and early years ===
Meina Munsky was born the second of her parents' two daughters in Wolfenbüttel at the height of the Second World War. Oskar Munsky (1910-1945 or 1947), her father, was a young architect who had studied with Hans Poelzig and worked during the 1930s on several high-profile public projects such as the Reichswerke Hermann Göring (industrial complex) and the rebuild of the Olypmpia Stadium underground station. He died, probably in a prisoner, of war camp when his daughter was an infant. Her mother, Gertrud Schmidt (1912-1986), worked as a photographer. Maina Munsky concluded her own schooling in March 1962 when she left the Anna-Vorwerk-Oberschule (as her secondary school was known at that time) with a Realschulabschluss (middle-school course completion certificate). For the next three years she studied with the artist Peter Voigt at the Braunschweig University of Art ("Hochschule für Bildende Künste Braunschweig" / HBK).

=== Student years ===
In 1963, after falling in love with a professor at the HBK in Braunschweig, Munsky became pregnant and had an abortion which necessitated a trip to Amsterdam, since having an abortion in Germany would have created a risk of criminal charges. The experience can be seen as having triggered a subsequent artistic theme. Supported by a bursary, from 1964 till 1967 she continued her studies at the Fine Arts Academy in Florence. She studied with Ugo Capocchini and emerged with an Italian qualification as a primary school teacher. While in Florence she underwent an image makeover, colouring her blonde hair black: it remained black for the rest of her life. She also changed to dressing exclusively black and changed the name on her birth certificate from "Meina Munsky" to "Maina-Miriam Munsky". The Jewish provenance of the name "Miriam" was significant. Between 1966 and 1970 she was in West Berlin, studying at the Berlin University of the Arts (known at that time as the "Hochschule für Bildende Künste" / HdK), where she studied with Alexander Camaro and Hermann Bachmann. She had her first solo exhibition in 1968. It was during her time at the HdK that she produced her first paintings of embryos in the womb.

=== Peter Sorge ===
There are indications that Meina Munsky started a teenage romance with the artist Peter Sorge during their school days, but the two later drifted apart. In any case, in the later 1960s, when she was keen to investigate the possibilities for exhibiting her paintings, Munsky and Sorge met up. He arranged her first solo exhibition in 1968. It opened in February of that year at the "Künstlerselbsthilfegalerie" (loosely, "Artists' Self-help gallery") at Großgörschen 35 where back in 1964 Sorge, already a successful young graphic artist, had been a founding member of the "Großgörschen exhibition community". The Großgörschen gallery occupied one floor of a former factory building in Berlin-Schöneberg. The artists of the so-called "Großgörschen group", who later became known as the "New Realists", held a generally sceptical attitude towards societal conventions, and drew inspiration from artists such as George Grosz, Hannah Höch and John Heartfield, along with the collage creators and Dadaism. Maina-Miriam Munsky and Peter Sorge married one another in 1970. That same year Munsky became a member of the German Artists' Association ("Deutscher Künstlerbund"): she exhibited at the associations' annual exhibitions till 1984. The couple's son, Daniel Ben Sorge, was born in December 1972.

=== The young artist ===
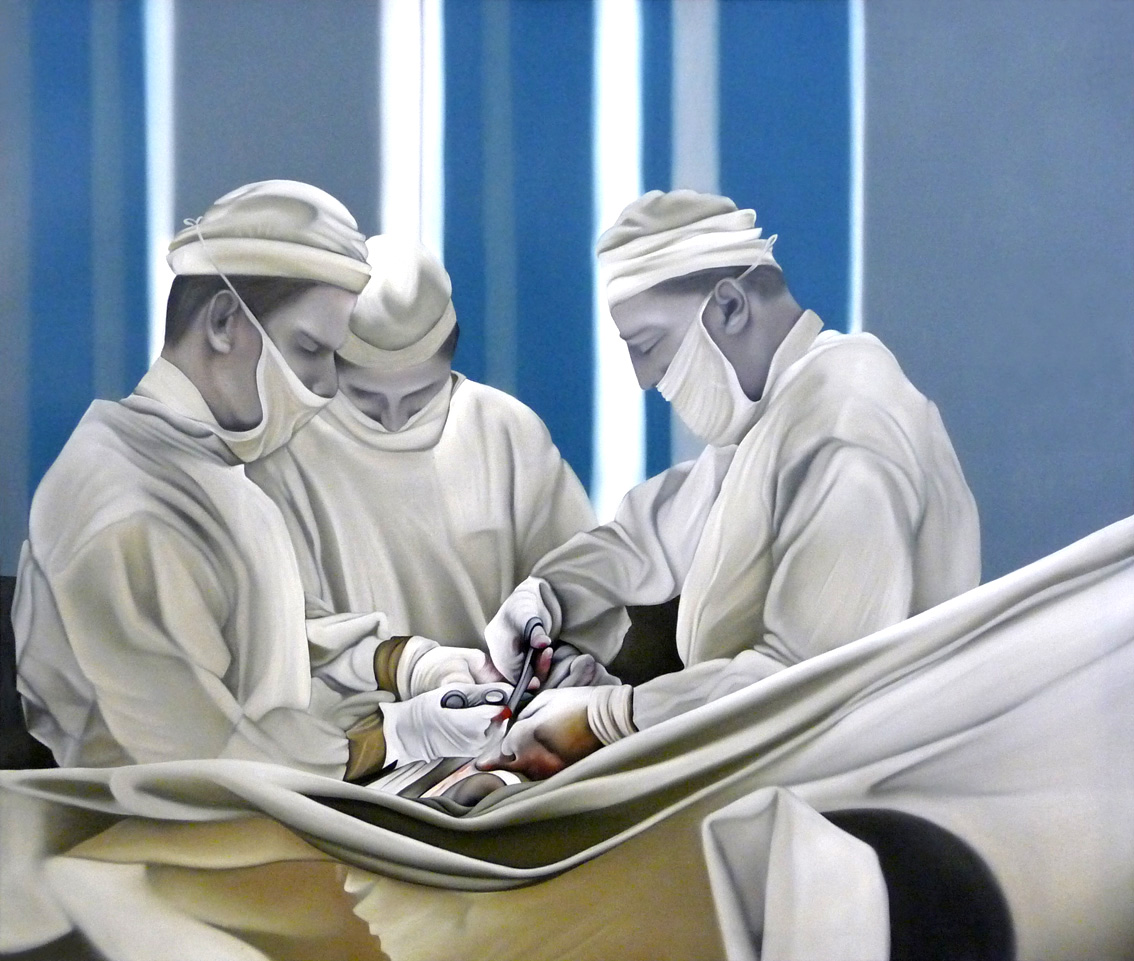
"Chirurgen"

Munsky was one of the founding members of the Berlin Aspect Group ("Gruppe Aspekt") which existed between 1972 and 1978. Some of the other more prominent members included the artists Hermann Albert, Bettina von Arnim, Ulrich Baehr, Hans-Jürgen Diehl, Arwed Gorella, Wolfgang Petrick, Joachim Schmettau and Klaus Vogelgesang, as well as her husband. During the 1970s she had her first museum sales. The Museum of Modern Art and the German Federal Republic Art Collection each acquired a work by Munsky. In a newspaper piece dated 2 May 1975 the art historian Katrin Sello wrote, "It is no criticism of the impersonal objectivity of modern gynecology, even if Maina-Miriam Munsky is included among the 'Critical Realists' in Berlin, and belongs to the 'Aspect Group'. The pictures provoke for quite other reasons. By setting before the viewer the real birth process without sublimation into idyll or mythology, they violate taboos and mobilise the total resistance of those confronted by them, forcing the viewer to turn away and abruptly reject what is before him or her, because of the way they stir up a traumatic frontier". (Note: "Das ist keine Kritik an der unpersönlichen Sachlichkeit moderner Gynäkologie, auch wenn Maina-Miriam Munsky in Berlin den Kritischen Realisten zugerechnet wird und der Gruppe „Aspekt“ angehört. Das Provozierende der Bilder liegt in einem anderen Bereich. In dem sie ohne alle Sublimierung ins Mythologische oder Idyllische den realen Vorgang der Geburt vor Augen führen, verletzen sie Tabus, mobilisieren sie alle Widerstände des Betrachters, bis zur Abwendung und abrupten Ablehnung, weil sie an eine traumatische Grenze rühren.")

=== "Women Artists International Exhibition 1877-1977" ===
Controversially, Maina-Miriam Munsky was excluded from taking part in the "Women Artists International Exhibition 1877-1977" ("Künstlerinnen international 1877-1977") held in the orangery at the Charlottenburg Palace. The "Women Artists International" was widely seen as the most important exhibition of women's art to date. Five hundred works by 190 female artists were on display: those who featured included Louise Nevelson, Paula Modersohn-Becker, Méret Oppenheim, Georgia O'Keeffe, Eva Hesse, Bridget Riley, Käthe Kollwitz, Sonia Delaunay and Gabriele Münter. The jury members came from the New Society for Visual Arts which had been founded in 1969. They were all women. They justified the decision to exclude Maina-Miriam Munsky with the argument that the uninvolved presentation of her birth pictures was "unwomanly" ("nicht weiblich"). Separately they accused the artist of being involved with the sexist pictures produced by her artist husband, Peter Sorge, whose drawings combined photographs from pornographic magazines with scenes of violence. During the early 1970s Munsky had seemed to distance herself from the rising tide of feminist solidarity. Asked about her position as a woman in the world of art she repeatedly and very publicly spoke out against women's groups closing ranks in ways that only created new structures of isolation.

One reason that the exclusion of Munsky's work from the "Women Artists International" became so contentious was the last minute nature of the decision. Her contribution had already been commissioned: the exhibition jury decided to remove it just before the exhibition catalogue was finalised for the printers. In an interview with Prof. Dr. Cäcilia Rentmeister which was publisher in March 1977 Munsky was uncompromisingly supportive of the women's movement:

"I have always taken a deep interest in these women's movement groups that were supportive in the abortion debate. About that I always thought to myself: hey, that's exactly what you want, why not go along with it? But there was also always the fear, dear God, of something else eating you up. And then that is one thing - or with the child two things - eating you up. But I certainly think the women's movement important, and I also believe that for our generation it is something that in the time left to us deserves to be supported, here, there and everywhere". (Note: "Ich habe mich immer sehr für diese Frauenbewegungsgruppen interessiert; da gab es doch Gruppen, die die Abtreibungssache unterstützt haben, und da hab ich immer gedacht: Mensch, das ist doch genau das, was Du willst, warum machst Du da eigentlich nicht mit? Aber da war halt immer die Angst, um Gottes Willen, noch was, was dich auffrißt. Und es reicht dann eine Sache oder jetzt mit dem Kind zwei Sachen, die einen auffressen. Aber ich halte die Frauenbewegung für derart wichtig, und ich glaube auch, daß es das ist, was von unserer Zeit, von unseren Jahren, später übrig bleiben wird, und daß das eine Sache ist, die man hinten und vorne und überall unterstützen sollte.") (Note: Munsky was understandably critical of the jury decision, but she was not without support. Sarah Haffner, who withdrew her own contribution to the exhibition in protest, was one of several other artists outspoken in their criticism of the jury's obscurantist criteria and of Munsky's exclusion. In the source-link cited here (which is a copy of a typescript) see, in particular, pages 10, 12, 14-16 and 24-25.)

=== Career progression ===
Between 1979 and 1981 the itinerant exhibition "feministische kunst internationaal" ("feminist art international") took place in museums in the Netherlands: several Munsky painting were included.

Recognition of Munsky in arts circles reached a high-point in 1982 when her six part set, "The Red Cloth" was exhibited alongside works by Frida Kahlo and Tina Modotti at an exhibition held at the Kunstverein in Hamburg. Between 1982 and 1984 she had a guest professorship for basic arts teaching at the Braunschweig University of Art ("Hochschule für Bildende Künste Braunschweig" / HBK) in Braunschweig. In 1984 she received the Lower Saxony Arts Prize. In 1988 she held a guest professorship at the Pentiment International Summer Academy of the Hamburg University of Applied Sciences. In 1990 she became a member of the Künstlersonderbund (artists' league), a somewhat alternative organisation that emerged that year as a breakaway movement from the German Artists' Association ("Deutscher Künstlerbund"). Further teaching assignments followed.

=== Death ===
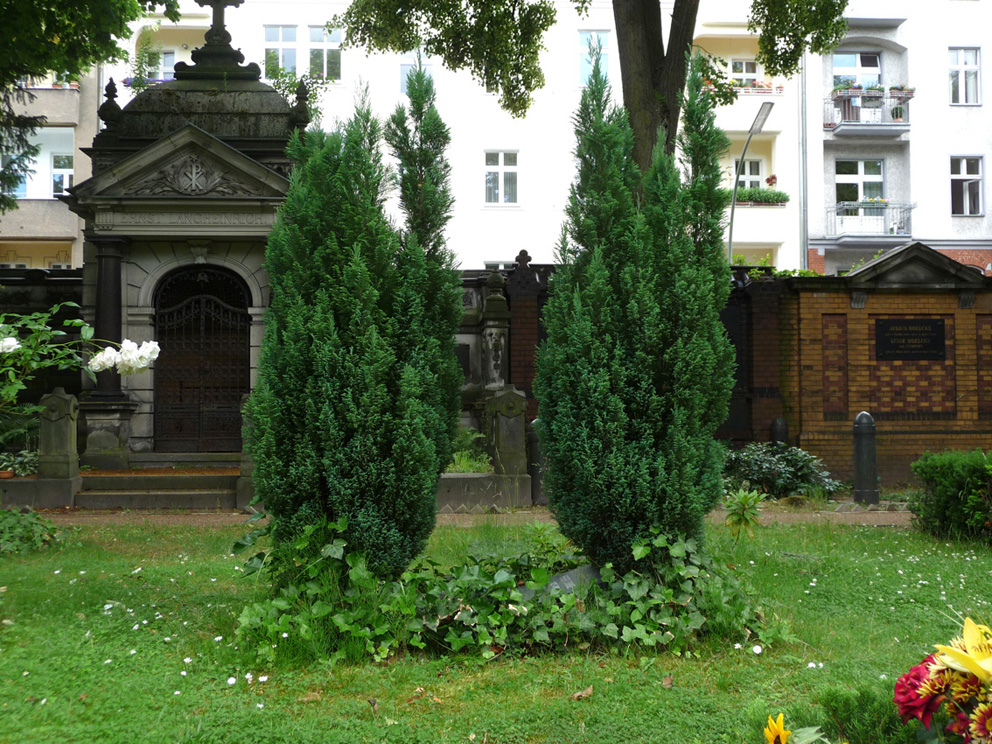
Munsky's grave

Maina-Miriam Munsky was just 56 when she died in 1999 as a result of her alcohol intake. Peter Sorge died three months later. Their bodies share a grave at the Alter St.-Matthäus-Kirchhof (churchyard) in Berlin-Schöneberg. In 2013 a first inventory of Munsky's work was compiled by Jan Schüler and published under the title "Die Angst wegmalen" (loosely, "Paint away the worry") by the Berlin-based Poll Art Fountation, who had represented the artist while she was alive.

== Works ==
Along with people such as Peter Sorge, Klaus Vogelgesang, Wolfgang Petrick and Ulrich Baehr, Maina-Miriam Munsky represented the artists of Critical realism which emerged as an artistic movement in West Berlin at the end of the 1960s. It is true these artists did not adhere to any fixed programme, but there were nevertheless things that they shared in common beyond simply an aspiration to interpret realism. They identified the need to differentiate their approach from American Photorealism and Hyperrealism, and dubious claims to reflect political experience in artistic work.

Munsky prepared her works by creating from which she then transferred to canvas with the help of a Slide projector. She was indeed not a photorealist in the usual sense, but oriented herself towards "new reality", applying a "verismo" approach that referenced the 1920s. In her pictures she rearranges the patterns and adapted the overall image by reducing it to essentials and applying a rigidly structured composition. Often her backgrounds use a monochrome presentation so that the viewer will not be distracted from the main subject matter. Her artistic themes revolved around conditions and processes such as pregnancy, birth, surgical operations and death. In pieces such as "Emancipation" and "Twins I and II" she features clinical spaces and medical equipment. She became known through her social-psychological presentations in these subject areas. She impressively "documented" with sober precision the potential for photorealism from the delivery room.

Munsky started producing pictures of births in 1967, which violated a taboo and met with resistance. She painted these early depictions of embryos, bodily hints, photographs and birth scenes applying a soft flowing style captured in lattice-structures, scaffolds, cages and lines. Her works from this period sometimes recall the surrealist forms from the pictures of Salvador Dalí or the works of Francis Bacon. In 1970, after undergoing an appropriate vetting process by a commission, she was permitted to spend nine months with the gynaecologist Erich Saling at the Gynaecological Clinic in Berlin-Neukölln. She was able to work in the delivery room, photographing during births and birth-related operations. After that her pictures acquired a more concrete and stronger form, while the situations they depicted became more readily recognisable. It was more than twenty years after embarking on her pictures themed on births and operations that she moved away from those topics. In 1989 she painted a series of pictures of sombre and unoccupied rooms, along with views out through faint window panes and house fronts.
