= Great Blunders of World War II =

- Genre: Documentary
- Country of origin: United States
- Original language: English
- No. of series: 1
- No. of episodes: 12

Production
- Running time: 20 minutes

Original release
- Release: 1998

Great Blunders Of World War II is a documentary series looking at some of the worst errors of World War II that affected the course of history. They are the decisions that have gone down in infamy, the battles determined not by bravery and brilliance but by incompetence and arrogance.

== Episode list ==
1. The German Blunder at Dunkirk
2. Hitler's Declaration of War on the US
3. The Pilot Who Bombed London
4. Blunders of Hitler's Luftwaffe
5. A Bridge Too Far
6. The Battle of the Bulge
7. Japan's Mistakes at Midway
8. The Failure of the Kamikaze
9. Death at Stalingrad
10. Operation Sea Lion
11. The Bomb Plot to Kill Hitler
12. The Scattering of Convoy PQ 17
