= German declaration of war on the United States =

1941 German war declaration

Declaration of war on the United States
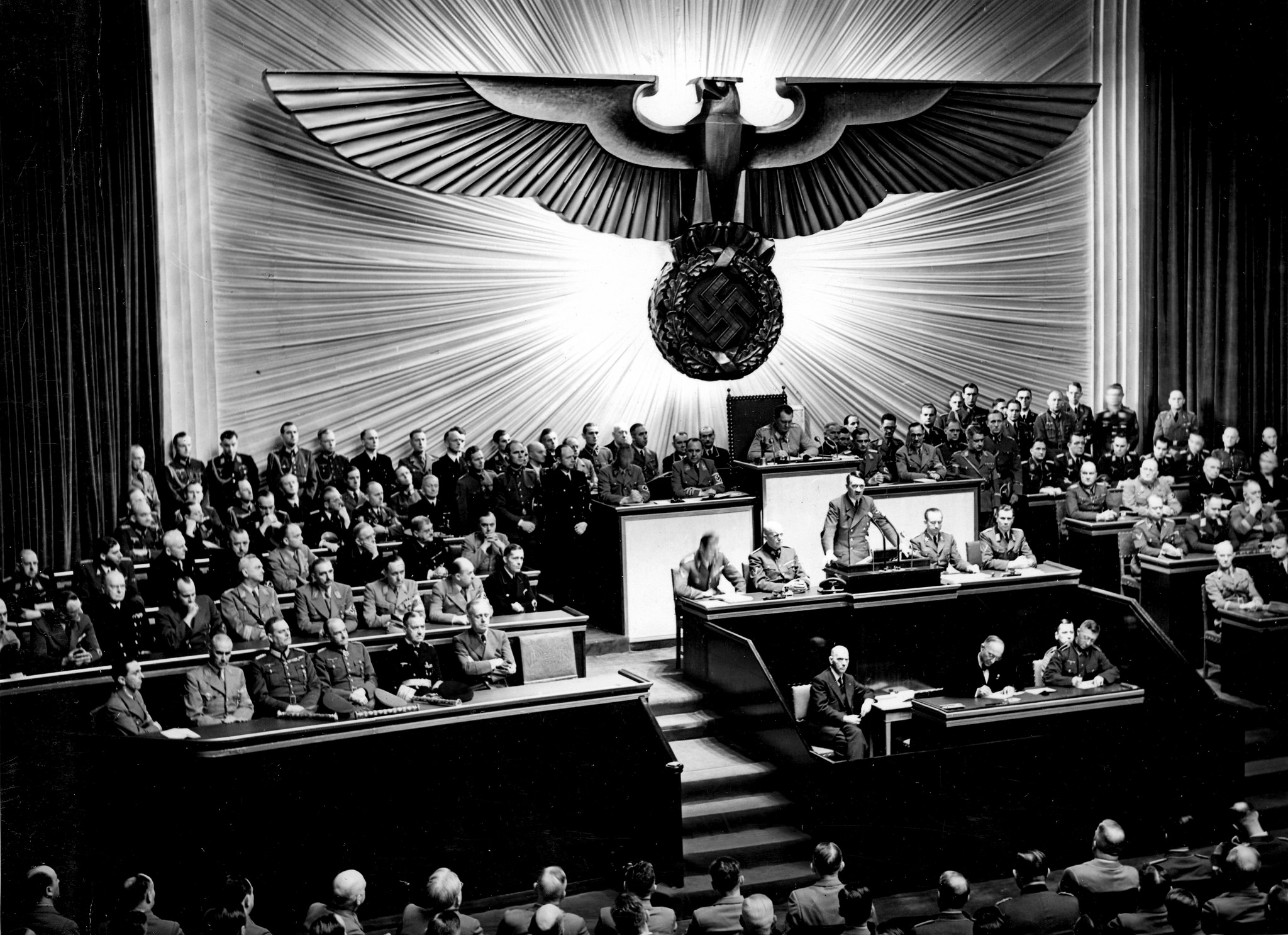
- Hitler announces the declaration of war
- Presented: 11 December 1941; 84 years ago
- Location: Reichstag, Nazi Germany
- Author(s): Adolf Hitler, Joachim von Ribbentrop
- Purpose: Declaring war on the United States for "having violated ... all rules of neutrality in favor of the adversaries of Germany"

Nazi Germany declared war against the United States on December 11, 1941, four days after the Japanese attack on Pearl Harbor and three days after the United States declared war on Japan. German officials said they were responding to a "series of provocations" by the United States when it was still officially neutral during World War II. Adolf Hitler made the decision after two days of consultation with Göring, Keitel, Raeder and German Foreign Minister Joachim von Ribbentrop, all of whom advised him to immediately declare war in view of the publication of the secret U.S. war plan Rainbow Five, and so the Kriegsmarine could begin the Second Happy Time. It has been referred to as Hitler's "most puzzling" decision of World War II. Germany had already been engaged in an undeclared war against the United States in the Battle of the Atlantic for several months.

The formal declaration was made by Ribbentrop in his office to American Chargé d'affaires Leland B. Morris. That same day, Benito Mussolini announced Italy's declaration of war on the United States the U.S. declared war on Germany. Germany's declaration eliminated any remaining meaningful domestic isolationist opposition to the U.S. joining the European war.

== Background ==
The course of relations between Germany and the United States had deteriorated since the beginning of World War II, largely because of the increasing cooperation between the United States and the United Kingdom. The Destroyers for Bases Agreement, Lend-Lease, the Atlantic Charter, the hand-over of military control of Iceland from the United Kingdom to the United States, the extension of the Pan-American Security Zone, and many other results of the special relationship which had developed between the two countries had put a strain on relations between the United States, still technically a neutral country, and Germany. United States warships escorting American supply vessels bound for the United Kingdom bearing aid were already engaged in an undeclared de facto war with German U-boats. Roosevelt's desire to help the British, despite the objections of the influential American isolationist lobby, and the Neutrality Acts imposed by Congress which prevented direct involvement in the war, brought the U.S. to push hard against the traditional boundaries of neutrality to prevent the Axis domination of Europe. By 1941, much of the Neutrality Acts had largely been repealed by the Lend-Lease Act, allowing Roosevelt more freedom to pursue further aid for Britain without legal impediments. Even before the Battle of France in 1940, American public opinion towards Germany had become increasingly hostile, particularly after Roosevelt won another election term in 1940.

On 7 December 1941, Japanese forces launched a surprise attack on the United States Pacific Fleet based at Pearl Harbor, Hawaii, heralding a war between Japan and the United States. Japan had not informed its ally, Germany, in advance of the attack, although the Japanese ambassador had communicated to the German Foreign Minister, Joachim von Ribbentrop, at the beginning of December that relations between the United States and the Japanese Empire had deteriorated to a point where hostilities were imminent. He was thereafter instructed to ask Germany for a commitment to declare war under the terms of the Tripartite Pact should that occur. Hitler and Ribbentrop had been urging Japan to attack and seize Singapore from the British, believing that doing so would not only harm the British cause, but would also serve to help keep the U.S. out of the war. Japanese leaders, including Hideki Tojo, were concerned that an attack on the United States would cause Germany to side with their racial kin and participate in an encircling of Japan with the United States and Britain. Therefore, the Japanese side urged for confirmation of German and Italian allegiance with Japan. On 28 November 1941, Ribbentrop confirmed to Hiroshi Ōshima, the Japanese ambassador to Germany, what Hitler himself had told Japanese foreign minister Yōsuke Matsuoka: that if Japan became embroiled in a war with the United States, Germany would, naturally, enter the war on Japan's side. When the Japanese asked for a written assurance of this, Hitler complied, with express consent from Mussolini. This agreement, drafted on 4 December, committed the primary Axis powers to go to war with the United States in the event of hostilities with Japan, and essentially superseded the Tripartite Pact as an offensive, rather than defensive, alliance.

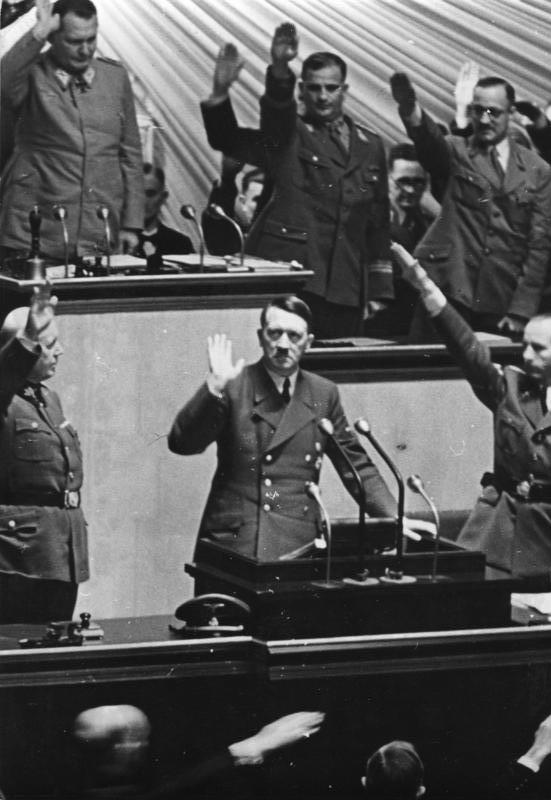
Closeup of Hitler as war is declared upon the United States, 11 December 1941

According to the terms of their agreements, Germany was obliged to come to the aid of Japan if a third country attacked Japan, but not if Japan attacked a third country. Ribbentrop reminded Hitler of this, and noted that a declaration of war against the United States would add to the number of enemies Germany was fighting, but Hitler dismissed this concern as not being essential to the outcome of the war, and, almost entirely without consultation, declared war against the United States. Hitler sought to preempt what he believed was an imminent declaration of war by Roosevelt, even though Roosevelt had not planned to declare war on Germany. In general, the Nazi hierarchy held low regard for the military resolve of the U.S. under Roosevelt, a stance that is widely considered a major error in their strategic thinking. In their eyes the United States was a corrupt, decadent, Jewish-dominated nation weakened by its large populations of African Americans, immigrants, and Jewish-Americans.

American public opinion swung heavily against Germany after Pearl Harbor, which was believed to be inspired by or organized by Germany. A 10 December Gallup poll (after Pearl Harbor but before the German declaration of war) found that 90% of Americans answered "Yes" to the question "Should President Roosevelt have asked Congress to declare war on Germany, as well as on Japan?"

== German declaration ==
Hitler arrived in Berlin on Tuesday 9 December and met with Goebbels at midday, when he disclosed his intention to declare war in a speech to the Reichstag, postponing the declaration for 24 hours to give himself time to prepare. A further meeting with Goebbels on 10 December finalised the planning, although Hitler had yet to work on his speech. The time selected was 3:00 pm, as it was a convenient time for German radio listeners and the broadcast could be received in Tokyo at 10:00 pm and in Washington DC at 8:00 am. Ribbentrop telephoned the German ambassador in Rome, asking him to contact Mussolini and ensure that Italy's declaration of war be coordinated with that of Germany. Meanwhile, there was considerable diplomatic activity to ensure that the amendments to the Tripartite Pact requested by the Japanese government be concluded; the Germans requested that the Japanese ambassador, Hiroshi Ōshima, should be empowered to sign the "No separate peace" clause on Tokyo's behalf to save time.

Britain and the United States were already aware of German intentions through Magic signals intelligence and on 9 December, Roosevelt gave one of his national "fireside chat" broadcasts in which he said the American people should "Remember always that Germany and Italy, regardless of any formal declaration of war, consider themselves at war with the United States at this moment just as much as they consider themselves at war with Britain or Russia". Churchill spoke in the House of Commons on the morning of 11 December, saying that "Not only the British Empire now but the United States are fighting for life; Russia is fighting for life, and China is fighting for life. Behind these four great combatant communities are ranged all the free spirit and hopes of all the conquered countries in Europe ... It would indeed bring shame upon our generation if we did not teach them a lesson which will not be forgotten in the records of a thousand years".

On Thursday 11 December 1941, American chargé d'affaires Leland B. Morris, the highest ranking American diplomat in Germany, was summoned to Foreign Minister Joachim von Ribbentrop's office where Ribbentrop read Morris the formal declaration; the meeting lasted from 2:18 to 2:21 pm. The text was:

MR. CHARGÉ D'AFFAIRES:

The Government of the United States having violated in the most flagrant manner and in ever increasing measure all rules of neutrality in favor of the adversaries of Germany and having continually been guilty of the most severe provocations toward Germany ever since the outbreak of the European war, provoked by the British declaration of war against Germany on September 3, 1939, has finally resorted to open military acts of aggression.

On September 11, 1941, the President of the United States publicly declared that he had ordered the American Navy and Air Force to shoot on sight at any German war vessel. In his speech of October 27, 1941, he once more expressly affirmed that this order was in force. Acting under this order, vessels of the American Navy, since early September 1941, have systematically attacked German naval forces. Thus, American destroyers, as for instance the Greer, the Kearny and the Reuben James, have opened fire on German submarines according to plan. The Secretary of the American Navy, Mr. Knox, himself confirmed that American destroyers attacked German submarines.

Furthermore, the naval forces of the United States, under order of their Government and contrary to international law have treated and seized German merchant vessels on the high seas as enemy ships.

The German Government therefore establishes the following facts:

Although Germany on her part has strictly adhered to the rules of international law in her relations with the United States during every period of the present war, the Government of the United States from initial violations of neutrality has finally proceeded to open acts of war against Germany. The Government of the United States has thereby virtually created a state of war.

The German Government, consequently, discontinues diplomatic relations with the United States of America and declares that under these circumstances brought about by President Roosevelt Germany too, as from today, considers herself as being in a state of war with the United States of America.

Accept, Mr. Chargé d'Affaires, the expression of my high consideration.

December 11, 1941.

RIBBENTROP.

According to George F. Kennan, a diplomat who worked with Morris, after reading the declaration, Ribbentrop screamed at Morris, "Ihr Präsident hat diesen Krieg gewollt; jetzt hat er ihn" ("Your President has wanted this war, now he has it"), turned on his heels and left the room.

The same text had been sent to Hans Thomsen, the German chargé d'affaires in Washington, with instructions to present it to Cordell Hull, the United States Secretary of State, at 3:30 pm, German summer time, 8:30 am Eastern Standard Time. On their arrival however, Hull refused to see the German delegation and it was not until 9:30 that they were able to pass their note to Ray Atherton, the head of the Division of European Affairs. In Berlin, there was consternation that Mussolini had decided to preempt Hitler and declare war in a speech from the balcony at the Palazzo Venezia at 2:45 pm; an estimated crowd of 100,000 gathered to hear his speech which lasted only four minutes.

At 3:00 pm, Hitler addressed the 855 deputies of the Reichstag gathered in the Kroll Opera House, with a speech lasting for 88 minutes in which he listed German successes to date. The second part of the speech was devoted to an attack on Roosevelt and "the Anglo-Saxon Jewish-capitalist world", concluding that "In the 2,000 years of German history known to us, our Volk has never been more unified and united than it is today". On the same day, German ambassadors in the capitals of the other Tripartite Pact signatories; Hungary, Romania, Bulgaria, Croatia and Slovakia, were instructed to obtain their declarations of war against the United States.

Roosevelt had written a brief note to Congress on the morning of 11 December asking them to declare war on Germany and Italy; meeting at noon, the motion passed through both houses without dissent, although there were some abstentions. Vice President Henry Wallace arrived at the White House with the declaration, which was signed by Roosevelt at 3:00 pm.

== Post-declaration opinions ==
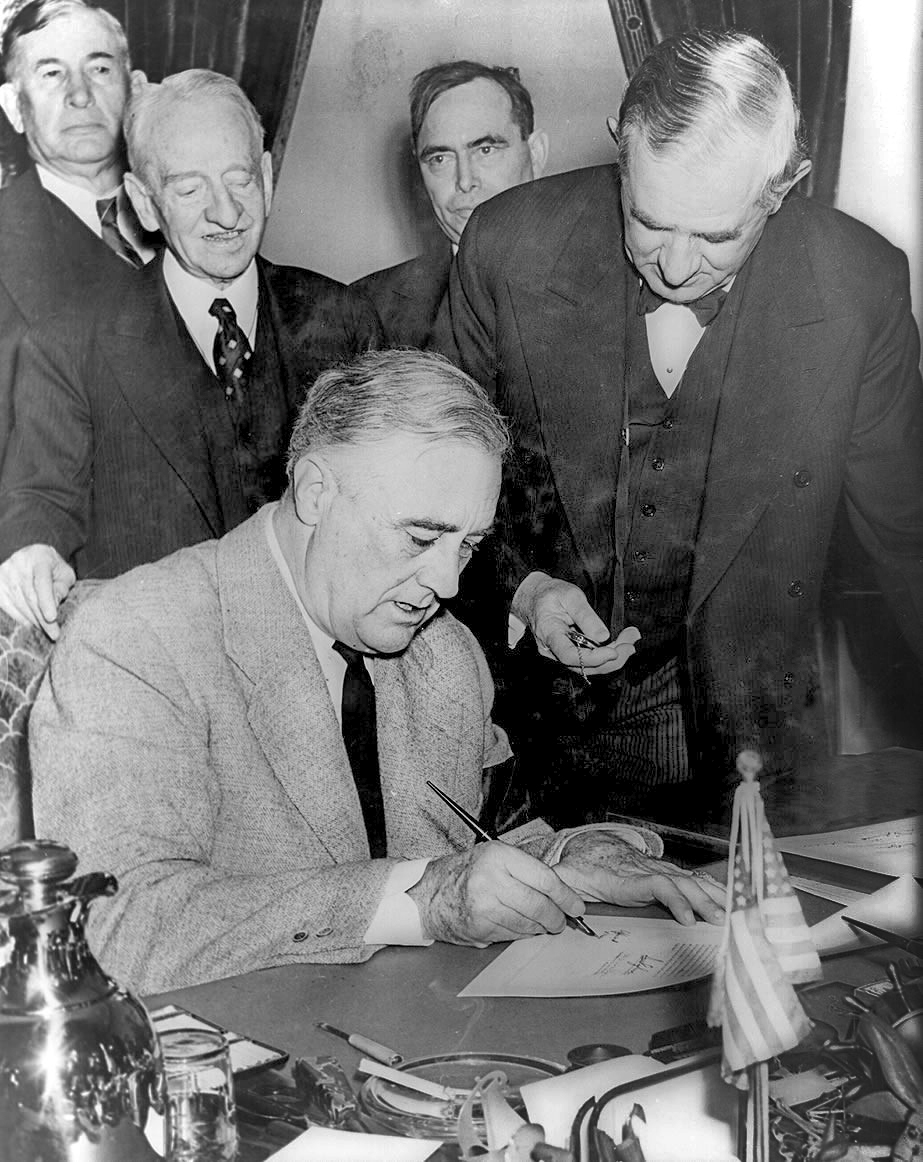
Franklin Delano Roosevelt's signing of the declaration of war against Germany, the response of the United States to Hitler's declaration

According to Hitler's naval adjutant, Admiral Karl-Jesko von Puttkamer, the Japanese attack on Pearl Harbor actually buoyed Hitler's assurance in winning the war, and improved morale among the high leadership of the armed forces. Peter Padfield writes:

The news [of Pearl Harbor] came as a surprise to Hitler although he knew of their intention to attack somewhere at some time and had made up his mind to support them if they attacked the United States. Now frivolously disregarding the huge financial and productive power of America and, according to ... von Puttkamer, blind to the realization that this power could be projected across the Atlantic, he gained renewed confidence in a victorious outcome to the war. His generals suffered from the same land-locked hallucination: his entire headquarters staff gave themselves up to "an ecstasy of rejoicing"; the few who saw further "became even lonelier". Naval officers saw no more clearly than the generals.

While Hitler's alleged reasons for declaring war against the United States were numerous, he was not obliged by treaty to support Japan except if it was directly attacked by a third party, and was inspired to respond promptly because of his enthusiasm for Japan's decisive surprise attack, which German forces had used when they attacked the Soviet Union during Operation Barbarossa in June 1941. Indeed, Hitler had confided to the Japanese ambassador "[O]ne should strike – as hard as possible – and not waste time declaring war." The prospect of a worldwide war also underscored Hitler's tendency towards grandiose thinking, and reinforced his feeling that he was a figure of historic proportions. As he said in his declaration speech to the Reichstag:

I can only be grateful to Providence that it entrusted me with the leadership in this historic struggle which, for the next five hundred or a thousand years, will be described as decisive, not only for the history of Germany, but for the whole of Europe and indeed the whole world.

Whatever consultations Hitler sought for his decision, he did not invite anyone from the Wehrmacht except perhaps for the sycophantic generals Alfred Jodl and Wilhelm Keitel to offer counsel. Jodl, who was Hitler's chief military advisor on operation planning, and his immediate second in charge, General Walter Warlimont, later recalled that it "was another entirely independent decision on which no advice from the Wehrmacht had either been asked or given". It is likely that if they had been asked, the military leadership would have advised against expanding the war, given the extent of the crisis on the Eastern Front. Hitler's Luftwaffe adjutant, Nicolaus von Below, who was told about the decision to widen the war when he returned from a month's leave, was astounded by Hitler's "cluelessness" about the military potential of the United States, and saw it as an example of Hitler's "dilettante approach and his limited knowledge of foreign countries". Nor had Hitler ordered the preparations necessary for such a decision or taken into account any logistical considerations. He may have seen a strategic advantage in the U.S. presumably being primarily engaged in responding to the Pearl Harbor attack, while German U-boats were unleashed on American shipping in the Atlantic, thereby severing the life-line of supplies to the UK, but he had not given Admiral Karl Dönitz any advance notification so he could position his U-boats to take maximum advantage of the new situation.

Hitler's lack of knowledge about the US and its industrial and demographic capacity for mounting a war on two fronts also entered into his decision. As early as mid-March 1941 – nine months before the Japanese attack – President Roosevelt was acutely aware of Hitler's hostility towards the United States, and the destructive potential it presented. Due to this attitude within the White House, and the rapidly progressing efforts of the Americans' industrial capacity before and through 1941 to start providing its armed forces with the ordnance, combat aircraft and ships that would be required to defeat the Axis as a whole, the US was already well on the path to a complete war economy which would make it the "arsenal of democracy" for itself and its allies. Hitler, however, was dismissive of the military power of the United States, a view that was shared by Hermann Göring. With German troops on the outskirts of Moscow, Hitler may also have counted on a quick defeat of the Soviet Union making available German economic and military resources tied up in that invasion.

Another factor was that Hitler's deeply-held racial prejudices made him see the US as a decadent bourgeois democracy filled with people of mixed race, a population heavily under the influence of Jews and "Negroes", with no history of authoritarian discipline to control and direct them, interested only in luxury and living the "good life" while dancing, drinking and enjoying "negrofied" music. Such a country, in Hitler's mind, would never be willing to make the economic and human sacrifices necessary to threaten National Socialist Germany – and thus set the stage for a dangerously inaccurate view of the very nation that Hitler had stated in his unpublished Zweites Buch (Second Book, 1928) would be the Third Reich's most serious challenge beyond his intended defeat of the Soviet Union.

The economic potential and racial composition of America had implications for Hitler's own ideological construct, indeed, how he saw Germany's current problems and future hopes. His central ideas of 'living space' and race held the key to his image of the United States. To Hitler the United States was a country with a white 'Nordic' racial core, to which he attributed its economic success and standard of living, and in which he saw a model for his vision of German 'living space' in Europe. (Note: As late as 24 February 1945, Hitler spoke of the "vast territory" of the United States in America, "ample to absorb the energies of all their people", as the model which he hoped to emulate for Germany in Europe, "to ensure for her complete economic independence inside a territory of a size compatible with her population", adding that "a great people has need of broad acres". Genoud, Francois, ed. (1961). The Testament of Adolf Hitler. The Hitler–Bormann Documents, February–April 1945. London. p. 88. For problems with this source, see Kershaw (2000), n.121, pp. 1024–25.)

It was also the case that from the German point of view, the United States was practically a belligerent already. Roosevelt had come as close to entering the war as a neutral power could possibly come, and perhaps had crossed over the line as well. For over a year, the U.S. had been providing large amounts of economic aid to Britain and the Soviet Union in the form of loans and credit and Lend-Lease; in the Atlantic Charter, Roosevelt had pledged that America would be the "arsenal of democracy" to forestall Axis domination in Europe. German attacks on American shipping – which came after a period in which U-boats were ordered to avoid doing so whenever possible – began well before the German declaration of war meant that American naval ships inevitably became involved in conflicts with German ones. Ribbentrop expressed the opinion that great powers do not wait to have war declared on them, and it may have seemed to Hitler – ignorant as he was of strains in the Anglo-American relationship – that the United States, as a near-belligerent, might formally declare war on Germany in any case.

From the perspective of the American administration, the United States was obliged to assist a fellow democracy in her struggle against Fascist aggression in Europe, which necessitated material and financial support, short of war, to both the British Empire and the Soviet Union. This provoked heated debate in the United States, but most Americans supported aid, not necessarily direct American involvement. The re-election of Roosevelt in 1940 also emboldened him to pursue further sustained aid to the United Kingdom, given he had already approved the destroyers-for-bases deal one month before the 1940 election. The cash-and-carry policy had also been adopted one year before, in September 1939. While these policies inevitably strained diplomacy between the two nations, American relations with Germany had deteriorated for years, particularly after the withdrawal of the American ambassador to Germany in 1938 following the Kristallnacht.

One advantage which the declaration of war against the U.S. provided for Hitler was as a propaganda diversion for the German public, to distract them from the state of the war against the Soviet Union, in which Germany had suffered severe setbacks and an unexpectedly prolonged engagement. Hitler had assured the German people that the Soviet Union would be crushed well before the onset of winter, but that, in fact, did not happen, and there was little in the way of good news. The timing of the Japanese attack on Pearl Harbor enabled Hitler to angle his planned speech to the Reichstag in a more positive fashion, squeezing as much propaganda value out of it as possible. Hitler, in fact, put off the speech – and the declaration of war – for several days, trying to arrive at the proper psychological moment to make the announcement. Still, the propaganda motive was hardly sufficient to justify declaring war on the US, especially considering that doing so would create an otherwise "unnatural alliance" between two disparate and heretofore antagonistic polities, the United States and the Soviet Union.

There was also a motivation linked to Hitler's own psychology. At a time when the Wehrmacht had just been forced by the Red Army and the Russian winter to move to the defense in the invasion of Russia, Hitler may have wanted to show by declaring war that he was still the master of the situation. Furthermore, throughout his life, Hitler had always gambled and won on the "long shot", betting everything on a single roll of the dice. Doing so had served him well up to this point, but his lack of information about the US and his ideological preconceptions about it made this particular choice a very poor one, unlikely to come up in Hitler's favor. From the historical perspective, however, his choice looks like a desperate act.

Regardless of Hitler's reasons for the declaration, the decision is generally seen as an enormous strategic blunder on his part, as it allowed the United States to enter the European war on the side of the United Kingdom, USSR and the Allies without much public opposition, while still facing the Japanese threat in the Pacific. Hitler had, in fact, committed Germany to fight the United States while in the midst of a war of extermination against the Soviet Union, and without having first defeated Britain, instead of taking the option of putting off a conflict with the U.S. for as long as possible, forcing it to concentrate on the war in the Pacific against Japan, and making it much more difficult for it to become involved in the European war. At least to some extent he had held in his hands the power to control the timing of the intervention of the United States, and instead, by declaring war against America, he freed Roosevelt and Churchill to act as they saw fit.

From the point of view of Hitler and much of the German political and military elite, declaring war against the U.S. in response to the Pearl Harbor attack was a calculated risk in fighting the U.S. before they were prepared to effectively defend themselves. By that time, the German leadership believed that the United States was effectively acting as a belligerent in the conflict, given actions such as Lend-Lease of supplies to Britain to sustain their war effort in the face of German aggression, President Roosevelt's public statements, the deployment of American soldiers and Marines to Iceland, and U.S. Navy escorts of convoys across the Atlantic, which sometimes came into contact with U-boats; these acts, as well as America's previous intervention in World War I, led to the assumption that war between them was inevitable. As such, the decision was made to use the attack as a rationale for an official declaration of war in order to drive Britain out of the conflict by widening submarine operations and directly attacking U.S. commercial shipping. While Hitler's declaration of war against the United States eventually led to his downfall, initially it seemed successful in its objective of more effectively cutting Britain's supply lines, as the U.S. military's lack of tactics, equipment, and procedures for fighting U-boats caused 1942 to be the most devastating year of the war for shipping losses; the war declaration enabled the Second Happy Time for U-boats.

Hitler's declaration of war came as a great relief to British Prime Minister Winston Churchill, who feared the possibility of two parallel but disconnected wars – the UK and Soviet Union versus Germany in Europe, and the US and the British Empire versus Japan in the Far East and the Pacific. With Nazi Germany's declaration against the United States in effect, American involvement alongside Britain in both theaters of the war as a full ally was assured. It also simplified matters for the American government, as John Kenneth Galbraith recalled:

When Pearl Harbor happened, we [Roosevelt's advisors] were desperate. ... We were all in agony. The mood of the American people was obvious – they were determined that the Japanese had to be punished. We could have been forced to concentrate all our efforts on the Pacific, unable from then on to give more than purely peripheral help to Britain. It was truly astounding when Hitler declared war on us three days later. I cannot tell you our feelings of triumph. It was a totally irrational thing for him to do, and I think it saved Europe.

Joachim Fest, one of Hitler's biographers, has argued that Hitler's decision was "really no longer an act of his own volition, but a gesture governed by a sudden awareness of his own impotence. That gesture was Hitler's last strategic initiative of any importance." Historian Ian Kershaw characterizes Hitler's decision to declare war on the US when he was not required to as "[A] typical Hitler forward move, attempting to seize the initiative ... [b]ut it was a move from weakness, not strength. And it was more irrational than any strategic decision taken to that date." In his biographical analysis, The Meaning of Hitler, journalist Sebastian Haffner said of Hitler's decision "There is to this day [1979] no comprehensible rational explanation for what one is tempted to describe as an act of lunacy. ... Even viewed as an act of desperation his declaration of war on America really does not make sense." (Note: Haffner speculates that the decision may have marked the beginning of Hitler's ultimate position that if the German people did not have sufficient "will" to win the war, then they deserved to go down in absolute ruin. He cites the recent setbacks on the Eastern Front, and Hitler's remarks on 27 November to the Danish and Croatian Foreign Ministers "If one day the German nation is no longer sufficiently strong or sufficiently ready to sacrifice to stake its own blood for its existence, then let it perish and be annihilated by some other stronger power ... In that case I shall shed no tears for the German nation." Haffner comments "Was the declaration of war on America the first hint that Hitler had inwardly changed gear? Had he decided that if he could not go down in history as the greatest conqueror he would at least be the architect of the greatest catastrophe?" (p.120))

== See also ==
- Declarations of war during World War II
- Diplomatic history of World War II
- Kellogg–Briand Pact

== Sources ==
- Bloch, Michael (1992) Ribbentrop. New York: Crown Publishing. ISBN 0-517-59310-6.
- Bullock, Alan (1992) Hitler and Stalin: Parallel Lives. New York: Knopf. ISBN 0-394-58601-8
- Genoud, François ed. (1961) The Testament of Adolf Hitler: The Hitler–Bormann Documents, February–April 1945. London:Cassell
- Hillgruber, Andreas (1981) Germany and the Two World Wars Cambridge, Massachusetts: Harvard University Press. ISBN 0-674-35322-6.
- Kershaw, Ian (1991). Hitler. Profiles in Power. Harlow, England: Pearson Education. ISBN 0-582-43756-3.
- Kershaw, Ian (2000) Hitler: 1936–1945: Nemesis. London: Allen Lane. ISBN 978-0393049947
- Kershaw, Ian (2007) Fateful Choices: Ten Decisions That Changed the World, 1940-1941 New York: Penguin. ISBN 978-1-59420-123-3
- Kershaw, Ian (2016). To Hell and Back: Europe 1914–1949. New York: Penguin Books. ISBN 978-0-14-310992-1.
- Mawdsley, Evan (2011). December 1941: Twelve Days that Began a World War. New Haven, Connecticut: Yale University Press. ISBN 978-0-300-15445-0.
- Smyth, Howard M.; and Lambert, Margaret, eds. (1964). Documents on German Foreign Policy, 1918-1945. London: H.M.S.O.
- United States Department of State (13 December 1941) Department of State Bulletin. Washington, DC: Government Printing Office
- Weeks, Albert L. (2004), Russia's Life-Saver: Lend-Lease Aid to the U.S.S.R. in World War II, Lanham, Maryland: Lexington Books, ISBN 978-0-7391-0736-2
