= Cristina Perincioli =

Swiss film director, writer, multimedia producer and webauthor

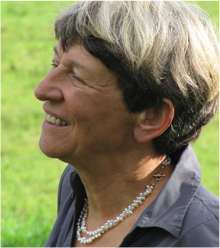
- Born: November 11, 1946 (age 79); Bern, Switzerland
- Education: Deutsche Film- und Fernsehakademie Berlin
- Occupations: Film Director, Writer, Multimedia Producer, Webauthor
- Notable work: For Women: Chapter 1
- Awards: Award of the Film Journalists in 1972

Cristina Perincioli (born November 11, 1946, in Bern, Switzerland) is a Swiss film director, writer, multimedia producer and webauthor. She moved to Berlin in 1968. Since 2003 she lives in Brandenburg.

Her docufiction films For Women - Chapter 1 and The Power of Men is the Patience of Women advanced the causes of the women's movement in the 1970s. Both films are now restored and their collaborative production method rediscovered.

From 1990 on she developed interactive storytelling, and on this basis, two adventure games with interactive video (1992. 1996), created seven computer serious games for the public space and several internet portals on violence against women.

== Life and career ==
In 1968, Cristina Perincioli moved to Berlin to study at the Deutsche Film- und Fernsehakademie Berlin (dffb – German Film and Television Academy). This motivated her to documentary films (Nixon in Berlin, Occupation of a Student Residence, Kreuzberg is Ours, Population Explosion) and feature films. Her docufiction about a women's strike, For Women: Chapter 1, from 1971 is one of the first contributions to Women's cinema in West Germany; the film won the "Award of the Film Journalists" at the International Short Film Festival Oberhausen 1972. Harun Farocki writes: "You can see how much fun liberating knowledge can be."

She was a co-founder of both the Lesbian movement in 1972 and 1973 of the first "Women's Center".

In 1977 Perincioli founded the Sphinx Filmproduktion GmbH, with Marianne Gassner as a production manager. The documentary fiction The Power of Men is the Patience of Women (ZDF/ Second German TV Channel, 1978) is also shown internationally. From an interview with Perincioli:

"When in 1974 I saw the first shelters for battered wives in England, I started in Berlin to interview women about domestic violence and found an unsuspected level of abuse. We – women from the women's movement and committed journalists – began from now on, to mobilize the public by radio and television broadcasts and by the book 'Violence in Marriage'. 1976 the first women's shelter opened in (West-)Berlin. In 1978 we shot this film together with women from the shelter, acting their own experiences. Internationally successful, the film supported the women's shelter movement in Germany, Australia, Canada, the US, Switzerland, Austria, Sweden and India. The title became a slogan."

Michael Althen described 2008 in the Frankfurter Allgemeine Zeitung functions and effects of the film as a

"... documentary fiction in which residents of Berlin's first women's shelter replay and comment their experiences with domestic violence. It's not about an individual fate, but about recurring patterns of violence and regret on men's side, about guilt and shame on women's side, about humiliating experiences in offices and the whole vicious circles of social and emotional dependencies. The film is strongest when articulating the silence of the social environment and lack of moral courage."

Restored and digitised, both films For Women - Chapter 1 and The Power of Men... were shown at the Courtisane Festival in Ghent in 2024. Programme designer Kristofer Woods writes:

"We glimpse at an all but forgotten approach to cinema, to a way of producing films with the purpose of social change. To politically engaged filmmaking not just in content, but in addressing the conditions of its production.“

In 1969, Perincioli was active in the anarchist paper Agit 883, in 1972 she co-founded the lesbian movement and in 1973 the first Berlin women's centre at Hornstrasse 2 in Kreuzberg, as well as the first Women's rape crisis center in Europe 1977.

In 1975, together with her partner Cäcilia Rentmeister, she wrote the screenplay for the first feature film about a lesbian relationship on German television, Anna und Edith (ZDF). The film shows how a love affair develops between two female colleagues in the middle of a labour dispute - similar to how many previously heterosexual women explored the "other shore" during the women's movement of the time.

Perincioli describes this as a contemporary witness in the rbb TV documentary series Berlin - Schicksalsjahre einer Stadt and also states how the women's movement of the 1970s found a particularly favourable climate as a "fast breeder" of pioneering ideas and practical projects under the "West Berlin cheese bell“

Perincioli published as radio- and book author. Inspired by research in London and Harrisburg, US, she contributed to the public debate and awareness about domestic violence and about the risks of nuclear energy.

From 1990 she developed interactive storytelling, and on this basis, two adventure game with interactive video (1992,1996), and created seven computer serious games for the public space ("Loud is Out", "Oh, the Few Drops", "Female, Male – and In-Between", "Culture Tester Rebellion")

She has taught at Kenya Institute of Mass Communication in Nairobi, the Berlin University of the Arts, the Deutsche Film- und Fernsehakademie Berlin, the Konrad Wolf Film University of Babelsberg, the Merz Akademie, and the Schule für Gestaltung Bern und Biel.

From the late 1990s on, Perincioli ventured to use interactive media for "sensitive issues" such as sexual and domestic violence; she created – employing user-friendly methods such as Discovery learning – award-winning web internet portals for understanding, counselling and preventing violence, funded by the German Federal Environmental Foundation, the Foundation Deutsche Jugendmarke, the Daphne Programme of the European Commission and the German Federal Ministry for Family Affairs, Senior Citizens, Women and Youth.

In 2015, Cristina Perincioli's new book Berlin wird feministisch. Das Beste, was von der 68er Bewegung blieb (Berlin Goes Feminist. Anarchism - Lesbianism - Feminism) was published in Germany. She describes the beginnings of the German second women ́s movement in the revolutionary years 1968–1974 in West Berlin. Through a wealth of documents, 80 photographs, reflections and interviews with 28 feminist activists, she shows where she and her fellow campaigners drew their ideas from, as well as the fury and strength they needed to put these ideas into practice. Perincioli also considers the beginnings of the women ́s movement as an example of how the modernization of society was initiated by "direct democratic" actions.

According to Sonya Winterberg the book shows that the second German women's movement has "many mothers":

"Perincioli...[offers] extensive and highly entertaining insights into the early lesbian and women's movement [...] This undogmatic, grassroots, autonomous and highly creative movement gave rise to vibrant projects, women's centers and lesbian groups, some of which still exist today. When Perincioli writes of the 'best that remained of the 68er movement, it is no exaggeration [...] Anyone who still believes that Alice Schwarzer was the mother of the new women's and lesbian movement would do well to take a look behind the scenes here."

Claire Horst also emphasizes the new "look behind the scenes":

"What a biography! Cristina Perincioli provides a first-hand account of the emergence of the second German women's movement, since she was there from the very beginning [...] And she doesn't ignore the turf wars and conflicts within the movement... [Another thing that makes the biography] well worth reading is the self-critical and often humorous stance the author adopts now, without distancing herself from the aims of the time." Horst also stresses the Berlin setting: "The book can also be read as a cultural history of the alternative Berlin of the 60s and 70s."

An English version of the complete book, translated by Pamela Selwyn, is published online: see "Websites" below.

Living in a village in Brandenburg since 2003 she keeps goats, makes cheese and manages and transforms her pineforest into a climat reslient mixed forest.

== Awards ==
1972 Perincioli received the "Award of the Film Journalists" at the International Short Film Festival Oberhausen for her thesis film at the Deutsche Film- und Fernsehakademie Berlin (dffb – German Film and Television Academy) "For Women: Chapter 1". Gwendolyn Audrey Foster writes about her directorial work: "Cristina Perincioli is an important figure in the tradition of Straub, Huillet an Fassbinder ..." (in "Women Film Directors. ... An International Guide" 1995, p. 306). Best rating for the CD-ROM "Save Selma" (Serious Game: prevention for children on the subject of sexual abuse) in Feibel's “Software For Children”-Ratings 1999 and 2000. For her web platform "www.4uman.info" to prevent violence in relationships (in English and German), Perincioli received at the 6th Berlin Crime Prevention Day 2005 the Securitas Award for the "innovative character of the site in violence prevention." Her website www.spass-oder-gewalt.de about prevention of sexual violence among young people in 2007 received the Thuringian Women Media Award.

== Works ==
=== Film ===
- Striking my Eyes, Bern/Schweiz (1966)
- Nixon Visit and Highschool Fight (Weekly Newsreel Collective) (1968)
- Occupation and Self-Administration of a Student Residence (with Gisela Tuchtenhagen) (1969)
- For Women: Chapter 1 (writer, director), a Documentary Fiction (with Gisela Tuchtenhagen)(1971)
- Kreuzberg is Ours (camera) (1972)
- Women Behind the Camera (co-author) (1972)
- Anna and Edith (book, along with Cäcilia Rentmeister), Feature Film, ZDF-TV (1975). Published on DVD by Edition Salzgeber
- The Power of Men is the Patience of Women (writer, director, producer) feature film/documentary fiction, ZDF-TV (1978). Published on DVD.
- Population Explosion, KIMC Nairobi, Kenya (1985)
- With Woman's Weapons (1986)

=== Writing (selection) ===
- Interviews on the topic of "Domestic Violence: Cases of Abuse" (Germany), and reportages and interviews on “Life in the Women´s Shelter in England", in: Sarah Haffner (Ed.): Gewalt in der Ehe, und was Frauen dagegen tun ("Domestic Violence – And What Women Do About It") Wagenbach, Berlin 1976
- Women of Harrisburg, Or: We don't let Us Talk Out of Fear, Rowohlt, Reinbek 1980, further editions 1986, 1991. Total book circulation 20.000.
- Eye and Ear – Computer and Creativity. A Compendium of Computer Graphics, Animation, Music and Video, co-author (Cillie) Cäcilia Rentmeister, DuMont, Cologne 1990
- "From Anarchism and Lesbianism to the Women's Center. Why had the Tomato to Fly so Far?", in: Heinrich Boell Foundation and the Feminist Institute (HGIN): How Far was Flying the Tomato? A Reflective Gala of the Women of 68, Boell, Berlin 1999.
- Berlin wird feministisch. Das Beste, was von der 68er Bewegung blieb, Querverlag, Berlin 2015. See "Websites" for complete English version.
- Frauen- und Lesbenbewegung in Westberlin in Rebellisches Berlin, Gruppe Panther & Co, Assozition A, Berlin, 2021

=== Websites ===
- feministberlin1968ff.de – Complete English Version of Cristina Perincioli's book Berlin Goes Feminist. Anarchism - Lesbianism - Feminism (Berlin wird feministisch. Das Beste, was von der 68er Bewegung blieb), Berlin 2015
- feministberlin.de - How the Women's Centre was founded in Berlin in 1973 and the 17 projects that followed
- www.save-selma.de – Exemption strategies from sexual abuse. For young people
- www.gewaltschutz.info – Information for victims of domestic violence and for counselors. Website in seven languages: English, German and five other languages
- www.ava2.de – "Anti Violence Awareness": Information, tools and videos for new methods of intervention in domestic violence, more effective assistance and offender programs, for police, health and social care, councils and women's representatives (offnine)
- www.4uman.info – Violence in relationships: awareness raising and information for men. In English and German
- www.spass-oder-gewalt.de – Prevention of sexual violence among young people: Learning platform for young people
- www.weiss-die-geiss.de – keeping dairy goats healthy - knowledge and experience from many countries.
- www.perincioli.ch – Sculptors Perincioli. 100 Years Life and Works at Berne, Switzerland – Works, Biographies, Records and Reception of Etienne and Marcel Perincioli
- www.klimaplastisch.de Perincioli reports on how she transformed her pine forests into mixed forest in the drought 2018-2022

== See also ==
- List of female film and television directors
- List of lesbian filmmakers
- List of LGBT-related films directed by women
