= Sarah Haffner =

German painter

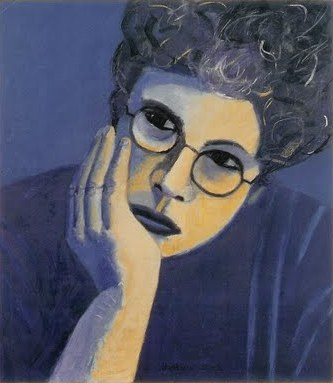
- A self portrait drawn in 2002. The colour blue featured prominently in Haffner's life and in her work.
- Born: Margaret C. Pretzel; 27 February 1940; Cambridge, England, United Kingdom
- Died: 11 March 2018 (aged 78); Dresden, Saxony, Germany
- Occupations: Artist; Author; Feminist activist
- Spouse(s): Andreas Brandt (artist) (marriage dates 1960-1962)
- Children: David Brandt (photographer)
- Parent(s): Sebastian Haffner (born Raimund Pretzel: 1907-1999); Erika Schmidt-Landry (born Erika Hirsch: 1899-1969)

Sarah Haffner (born Margaret Pretzel: 27 February 1940 – 11 March 2018) was a German-British painter, author, and active feminist. In West Berlin she engaged with the protest issues of the 1960s, on occasion alongside her father, the journalist and writer Sebastian Haffner. Through a television documentary and a book she was instrumental in the late 1970s in establishing the city's first women's shelter. The range of her painting included portraits, still lifes, landscapes and cityscapes.

== Early years, England ==
=== Émigré parents ===
Margaret Pretzel was born in Cambridge, England. Her Berlin-born father, Raimund Pretzel (Sebastian Haffner) had qualified as a lawyer, but abandoned the legal profession after 1933, and at the time of his daughter's birth was attempting – ultimately with considerable success – to reinvent himself as a journalist and author. He had fled from Germany with his pregnant fiancée, whom the authorities had identified as Jewish, in 1938. The couple had only received permission to remain in Britain for twelve months, but they nevertheless married in the late summer of 1938, basing themselves in Cambridge where Kurt Hirsch, his wife's brother, had recently received his doctorate in mathematics from the university. The outbreak of war in September 1939 seems to have removed the threat that the British would send the little family back to Nazi Germany, but instead Raimund Pretzel was identified as an enemy alien and in February 1940 locked away in a prison camp in Devon. It was while he was in this camp that he (and the other prisoners) learned of his daughter's birth through a tannoy announcement: "A little black head girl from Mister Pretzel". Shortly afterwards he was moved to the Isle of Wight.

Her mother already had one son, Peter, the elder of Sarah Haffner's two brothers, born as a result of her earlier marriage, to Harald Schmidt-Landry. Erika Schmidt-Landry (1899-1969), had been working as a journalist with a women's magazine till 1938.

=== New names ===
During the early part of his time as a political refugee in England, before the authorities arrested him, Raimund Pretzel completed his book, Germany. Jekyll & Hyde. It was his first "serious" book on history and politics: till now his publications had concerned fashion, music and entertainment. He used a pseudonym in order to try and protect relatives who remained in Germany against unwelcome questions from the Gestapo. He chose the name "Sebastian Haffner", explaining it as a celebration of two of Germany's great positive contributions to the world. "Sebastian" was the middle name of Johann Sebastian Bach and "Haffner" recalled Mozart's 35th Symphony. He very soon adopted the pseudonym as his regular name: his daughter's family name therefore changed from "Pretzel" to "Haffner".

"I am one and a half people. I am half German, half English and half Jewish." In that order.
"Ich bin anderthalb Personen. Ich bin halb deutsch, halb englisch und halb jüdisch." In dieser Reihenfolge

Sarah Haffner in conversation with Viola Roggenkamp, 1993

She would adopt the name "Sarah" only when she was a teenager, however. "Sara" was the name the Nazis had scornfully imposed on every Jewish woman, regardless of her real name. Adopting "Sarah" as her own "Christian" name after the Nazi nightmare had ended, seemingly for good, was, for Sarah Haffner an important part of discovering and asserting her own identity.

=== Childhood ===
In May 1940 her mother was also interned by the British, both parents now identified as enemy aliens. Her parents were deported to the Isle of Man where they were held in separate camps, unable to contact each other. Their daughter was permitted to stay with her mother, however. Shortly before her mother's release, in October 1940, the child won a baby competition, officially designated as the most beautiful baby in the internment camp. The British authorities were beginning to see the irony of locking up large numbers of German political refugees whose only obvious crime had been to escape from Nazi Germany in order to avoid being killed. Raimund Pretzel had been among the first to be released. His recently published book Germany. Jekyll & Hyde had resonated with a number of members of the British establishment who had been unable to understand why the author had been locked away. Someone else impressed by the book had been David Astor of The Observer (newspaper). Sebastian Haffner accepted an offer to write regularly for the paper, initially on a freelance basis. The family relocated to London in 1942, their financial position no longer so precarious as when they had arrived in England in 1938.

Most of her childhood was spent growing up with her family in London. Sarah Haffner was very close to her father. When she was nine he took her to her first concert. The Amadeus Quartet were playing: four fellow refugees from Nazi race-hate, and one of the twentieth century's greatest string quartets. They played Schubert's String Quartet No. 13. The audience cheered and gave the players a standing ovation. Sarah Haffner felt hugely privileged to be present for that occasion, with her father behind her.

Her eldest (half) brother, Peter, was identified as an artistic talent from a relatively early age, and it was he who drew their parents' attention to Sarah's growing artistic talent. In 1953 he recommended that they should use her oil paintings as serious Christmas presents.

== Germany ==
=== 1950s West Berlin ===
As a result of editorial differences with David Astor at The Observer, in 1954 Sebastian Haffner resigned as the paper's foreign editor, and accepted a financially generous offer to be its Berlin correspondent. For Sarah (and for her mother, Erika) it was an unhappy move. She had left a "world city" (and her half brother, Erika's son Peter, already an established artist) for Berlin and West Germany which she found "incredibly" provincial ("unglaublich kleinkariert", "piefig"). Her favourite author was to remain Christopher Isherwood, whose Berlin stories of the last hedonistic Weimar years recalled a city very different from the walled-in "Western Sector" in which she now found herself.

For the rest of their lives Sarah and her father would operate an Anglo-German existence, balancing the two cultures in their domestic and professional lives. Sarah's intention to make her way in life as a painter ran into parental opposition. Her father insisted that she would never be able to support herself as an artist. She should complete her school career in Germany and she might then train for work as a graphic artist, a branch in which she might find reliable employment in commerce or advertising. Or she might become a specialist restorer of "old masters". The arguments lasted for months. When she was sixteen she diverted into vocational training for a lifetime career as a serious artist.

Haffner attended the "Meisterschule für das Kunsthandwerk" handcraft academy in West Berlin for a year.

Aged seventeen, on the recommendation of teachers at the handicraft academy, she moved on to the Berlin University of the Arts ("Hochschule der Künste" / HdK). After mastering the basics she was accepted into the specialist painting class taught by Ernst Schumacher.

=== Family matters ===
When she was nineteen she became pregnant. "Stupidly, I became pregnant when I was 19 (laughs) / Dummerweise bin ich mit 19 schwanger geworden (lacht)". She was married to the artist Andreas Brandt between 1960 and 1962. David Brandt would grow up to become a successful photographer, based in Dresden, but his birth in 1960 caused his mother to break off her studies at the HdK, from which she would graduate only in 1973. She was, in the meantime, able to support herself as a freelance artist.

=== Political engagement in the 1960s ===
In August 1961, as he called for harder western protest against the building of the Berlin Wall, Sebastian Haffner parted ways with The Observer. In November 1962, he also broke with the conservative Die Welt. In defiance of publisher Axel Springer, he had intervened against the government in the Spiegel affair. Sarah herself, was becoming politically active, engaging with a new protest generation (swollen in West Berlin by young people evading military conscription from the Federal Republic) and was later to believe that she may have helped draw her father, uncharacteristically, to the left.

Along with a host of writers and intellectuals (including Ingeborg Drewitz, Hans Magnus Enzensberger, and Günter Grass), in June 1967, Sarah was a signatory to an open letter accusing the Springer Press of "incitement" in the police shooting of the student protester Benno Ohnesorg. The Springer titles Bild and Berliner Morgenpost had been characterising left-wing students, called by Ulrike Meinhof in the journal konkret to protest a visit by the Shah of Iran, as a subversive threat. Writing himself in konkret, Sebastian Haffner described the incident as a "pogrom" with which "fascism in West Berlin had thrown off its mask".

In February 1968, Sarah Haffner participated in the International Vietnam Conference called by the SDS (the Socialist German Student union). With New Left luminaries Noam Chomsky, Ernest Mandel, Herbert Marcuse and Jean Paul Sartre, and with Ulrike Meinhof, Sarah signed the final declaration, defining Vietnam as "the Spain of our generation". Two months later SDS leader Rudi Dutschke, who had been vilified in Bild, was shot on the streets of West Berlin.

Meinhof now began considering a next step in a struggle with "fascism" and, given their public association, the result was particularly painful for the Haffners. On 19 May 1972, the Red Army Faction (the "Baader Meinhof Gang") bombed Springer's Hamburg headquarters injuring 36 people. Five days later they claimed what was to be the first of 34 victims murdered over 28 years, two American soldiers killed in an explosion at a military base in Heidelberg.

== Career ==
=== Teaching in Watford and Berlin ===
Alongside her work as an artists and author, Sarah Haffner was involved as a teacher at various academies between 1969 and 1986. In 1969 she returned to England intending, as she later explained, to enhance her earnings and to get away from the increasingly fevered atmosphere among students and academics as the Paris events of May 1968 resonated with student radicals in the German cities. Her brother, Peter, had been teaching at the Watford School of Art since 1960. In England it was possible to become an art teacher without the inflexibly regulated file of qualifications and certificates that would have been needed in Germany. She obtained a three term contract at the same institution as her half-brother, which provided a livelihood in the London area for the next fifteen months. However, she found herself ill-suited to the "small-talk dinner party culture" which seemed to be part of the artistic milieu of the time and place. She also noted that whereas in Germany the tradition had endured since the nineteenth century whereby "every architect, dentist or psychologist" would invest in one or two pieces of original art - or at least a print - for the waiting room, no equivalent custom existed in England. There would be no easy path to riches as a free-lance artist in England. After fifteen months she returned to Berlin with her son.

Her teaching experience in England now helped her obtain a job at the "1. Staatlichen Fachschule für Erzieher" (teacher training academy) where for ten years, till 1981, she taught "Children's Play and Work" ("Kinderspiel und Arbeit"). Between 1980 and 1986 she taught at the Berlin University of the Arts ("Hochschule der Künste" / HdK).

=== Freelance artist in Berlin ===
Despite her father's earlier misgivings, Sarah Haffner built a successful career as a freelance artist in Berlin. She took to specialising in large oil paintings, but there were also smaller more spontaneous works. As art became her principal source of income she reached the point of selling between eight and ten abstract landscape paintings each year. Initially she obtained a price of around 1,500 Marks per painting, but over the years she became better known and the price per painting rose to an average of around 4,000 Marks. Selling one or two of her larger paintings in a year meant she could, as she told an interviewer ruefully, "live well". She avoided working with galleries who might take commissions as high as 40% or 50%, but managed to have her work featured in perhaps four or five exhibitions each year. Positive reviews and recognition followed little by little.

In commercial terms there were nevertheless also bad years. Unlike many left-wing artists with whom, as an instinctively anti-authoritarian woman, she mixed, Sarah Haffner welcomed the fall of the wall and reunification. Nevertheless, the reunification, formalised in October 1990, introduced an additional two thousand professional painters to the Berlin art market. There was, at that stage, no corresponding increase in potential buyers for contemporary art. The market was further depressed by uncertainty about the future, as westerners faced supplementary taxation to finance the economic regeneration of the "neuen Bundesländer" (former East Germany). In 1992 income from her art plunged to a net figure of 7,000 Marks. For Haffner, however, there was a spectacular rebound in 1993. Following a Berlin exhibition that included her work, the Berliner Zeitung published a particularly positive review. A Swiss collector read the review while on a flight, and purchased nine pictures. A succession of further sales followed. In 1993 Sarah Haffner's earned a net income of 170,000 from her art "with which I could live for several years".

=== Advocacy for women's shelters ===
In 1975 Sarah Haffner worked on a television documentary on violence against women, highlighting the existence in England of shelters for women escaping domestic violence. She had been prompted to produce the documentary by her own futile attempts, involving the police and other public officials, to help a neighbour in Berlin who had become a victim of domestic violence. She followed up the documentary with a book, "Gewalt in der Ehe und was Frauen dagegen tun", on the same theme. The documentary led to the funding of a shelter for women in Berlin. It was the first shelter of its kind anywhere in West Berlin or West Germany. Haffner herself worked for six months at the shelter on an unpaid basis.

== Death ==
Until well into the second decade of the twenty-first century Sarah Haffner lived and worked in the Charlottenburg quarter of Berlin, close (on its western side) to the infamous wall. She became aware that she was incurably ill several months before she died, and continued, as before, to insist that she had no wish whatever to be "kept alive at any price". She moved away from Berlin and spent her final months living close to her son, David Brandt, a professional photographer based in Dresden. She was 78 when she died there.

== Work ==
=== The painter ===
Sarah Haffner's artistic spectrum includes portraits, still lifes, landscapes and cityscapes. After 1985 her figurative style evolved from an additive object-oriented focus towards an increasingly abstract presentational approach. Her tectonically structured and strongly formed shapes, and the reduced imagery leave the forms shown as coloured surfaces. In apparent contrast to the rigidity of the forms is the intensity of the colours she uses. Her colour selection is expressive and spatial rather than naturalistic. She is in particular drawn to shades of blue and green. Frequently the colour selection intensifies a mood of isolation and melancholy that emanates from the tranquil scenes and views.

Haffner used her figurative painting style to evoke mood and atmosphere. Images which at first glance appear intensely personal often turn out to reflect far more general experience, which Sarah Haffner uses to disclose social realities, but without venturing into overt agitation.

After 2004 she took to working with a "Tempera and Pastell" mixing technique that she had developed for herself.

== Reflections of a female artist ==
Through her writings and in interviews Sarah Haffner developed a reputation as a committed feminist. Several of the themes to which she would return are encapsulated in a lengthy interview she gave to the academic, Prof. Dr. Cäcilia Rentmeister in 1977. The interview also provides insights into Haffner's own life and career.

"When I was seventeen I enrolled at the Arts Academy (HdK) where I felt appallingly uncomfortable, and although I could not have put it in to words back then, I was subconsciously aware that I was viewed in the first instance not as an artist but as a woman, and that it was as a woman that I generated interest. That created a pressure that meant that when I went to class in trousers, I knew that I would paint. But if I went in wearing a dress I knew I would hang around in the faculty waiting for people to talk to me ... I knew precisely that within me there were two separate mindsets - a form of inner schism, if you will - I was extremely ambitious, but for me it was also quite clear that you can only achieve if you constantly work at it. But it was not just me: all the girls at the academy knew that somehow they were not valued at their full worth. I certainly suffered from that: I valued myself fully, demanded much of myself, and somehow I was disappointed that my own self-assessment diverged so far from the reactions of others."

Sarah Haffner was no stranger to the tensions between motherhood and career ambitions. Her own situation was further complicated by marriage.

"My husband only painted stripes ... Nevertheless, as a painter he was always the more important of us ... I have always seen relationships as disrupters of independence, and could under those circumstances paint only very badly ... I was in an "artists' marriage", it was awful. Because in the end the relationship between us became somehow competitive ... and when my son was born, my husband had just been given his own studio at the academy, and I said, 'now It's my turn to paint again, and he must care for the child'. But for him it was perfectly clear that I would now simply be a homemaker ... Bringing motherhood and painting together, that was an eternal ... hiccup."

Sarah Haffner would interrogate gender stereotypes, whether they were applied by women or by men. She was indignant when the selectors of the female artists to be featured in the "Künstlerinnen International 1877 - 1977" exhibition, held in Berlin in 1977, decided not to allow the artists Maina-Miriam Munsky and Natascha Ungeheuer to participate. Haffner withdrew her own work from the exhibition in protest and published a statement:

"For hundreds of years paintings produced by women have been kept as secrets, hushed up, or attributed to men ... Now, for the first time, there is to be a major exhibition of women's art in West Berlin. Women's paintings, you would think, are the paintings produced by women. Maina-Miriam Munsky and Natascha Ungeheuer were not invited to take part in the exhibition. Their paintings are alleged to be sexist or unwomanly. Determination of what is womanly and what is unwomanly is undertaken by a self-declared elite coterie of women who at no point bothered even to introduce themselves to the exhibition participants or openly to set forth their selection criteria, far less to familiarise themselves with feminist priorities which participants represent... The women's movement must be open to all women or it will break down. But it is far too important to be allowed to break down. I will not take part in this exhibition: that is my protest."

Sarah Haffner lived through the "1968 events" and the manifestations of Second-wave feminism both as an art student and as a young mother. In one of a series of radio interviews conducted (and subsequently published in 2002) by Ute Kätzel, she recalled her experiences of those events. From early in 1968 Haffner took to participating in meetings of the West Berlin "Action Council on Women's Liberation".

"I remember twelve or fifteen women, telling everything about themselves ... I had always thought there was something not quite right with me, but now I saw that we all had been through the same experiences ... I never felt more alive ... I identified completely with the Action Council ... this process of self-awareness building that we went through, which became a realisation among the women concerning their own oppression. I even think that women were the revolutionary part of this somewhat wider revolutionary movement, precisely because they questioned their own situations."
