= Flying Lesbians =

German music group

The band's logo, also used as the cover of their album

The Flying Lesbians were a seven-woman German music group that existed from 1974 to 1977 and released an eponymous album in 1975. The album was successful, with about 17,000 LPs sold. They were one of the first women's rock groups in Europe.

== History ==
The Flying Lesbians functioned as a co-operative, wrote lyrics in German and English, and composed all songs by themselves. They also did all their own set up and transported all the equipment for their shows, part of their goal of "being liberated from male assistance." For copyright purposes they worked under the joint pseudonym of "Emily Pankhurst." Their logo was a labrys, a double-headed axe. Their website explains that this is an ancient symbol of women's power throughout Europe. History and significance told by Cillie Rentmeister in English.

After forming "over night," according to keyboardist Cillie Rentmeister, they rehearsed twice before they performed their first show to an audience of 2,000 at the first German women's festival in Berlin in 1974:

On May 11, 1974, the Berlin Women's Center organized the first public women's festival in West Germany. The Rockfete im Rock (Rock Party in a Skirt, in German, the word Rock also means skirt) was a politically significant event at the time, and men were not admitted. A popular UK band cancelled its performance, and a newcomer band played in its place: The Flying Lesbians had formed a few days earlier and consisted of seven women from the amateur music scene. Their performance was a hit.

The Flying Lesbians produced an LP and toured West Germany and Europe in the years that followed. Lyrics translated in English: Bisexuality, We’re the homosexual women.

They rocked fiercely through the summer of 1974 - for women only - including a show at the legendary women's camp on the Danish Island of Femø. The band became a role model for several other women bands, including Lysistrara, UnterRock, Schneewittchen, Les-Be-Ton, and Ausserhalb."

This 1974 international women's camp on the Danish island of Femø - with participants from Europe and the US, including Diana E.H. Russell - and the adjoining, big open air women's festival in the Danish Capital Copenhagen were a milestone for the European women's movement. It was here that the impetus and concepts were created for the first "International Tribunal on Crimes against Women" following the "International Women's Year" in Brussels, Belgium in 1976. The Flying Lesbians actively engaged and played in both events, in Copenhagen they played in front of 30,000 festival visitors - this only three months after their founding as a band in Berlin.

During the International Tribunal in Brussels in March 1976, the Flying Lesbians performed twice. Diana E.H. Russell describes the special social function and atmospheric effects of their music for the Tribunal:

For many women the most enjoyable events of the Tribunal were two parties on Saturday and Sunday nights. Some coordinating committee members felt that it was important to have some good social times together, and so we had invited The Flying Lesbians, an extremely popular feminist seven-piece rock band from Germany, to play once or twice during the Tribunal. While they were willing to play for free, as they always do for feminist events, they did need their transport costs. Because of our financial situation, we had delayed too long to rent a large enough hail for a party. So we ended up having two parties over the weekend in the far too small women’s center, Maison des Femmes. Hundreds of women, gay and straight, danced exuberantly to The Flying Lesbians’ music, and the crushed conditions didn't seem to bother anyone. In situations where language and cultural differences can so obstruct communication and feelings of solidarity, music, singing, and dance can be much more effective. The Matson [sic; i. e. Maison] des Femmes will never be the same after its first all women dance, and the same is true for some of the partying women.

In the years from 1974 until 1977 the Flying Lesbians became the musical "voice of the women's movement". In 1977, Miriam Frank stated in "off our backs":

Flying Lesbians is wonderful German, women-made music… The Flying Lesbians are the German women’s movement expressed in music. Each song reflects an important idea, criticism or problem that is being worked out now in the project collectives and women’s centers of West Germany, or that is being argued about in women’s Kneipes (bars) and around communal tables. The record is alive…not only because it is popularly distributed and widely played, but also because it successfully synthesizes ideas and action through music – Rock music…

The blatantly lesbian songs by the Flying Lesbians are surely different from the cozy sweetness of the last few years in American Lesbian music. They’re refreshingly aggressive and controversial. The first song, I’m a Lesbian, How About You is a tight boogy woogy, very danceable, with especially nice piano and guitar work. It’s a lot of fun, and then come the two hard ones... The Flying Lesbians really take off with Frauen kommt her. This song, Women, come on, let’s get it together, united we are strong (transl.) has been sung in the women’s movement for years now, in small groups, at demonstrations, in ever-widening circles, and the Rock setting gives the song a special richness, openness and happiness. It’s the showpiece of the record...

== Legacy ==
Cillie Rentmeister in several essays reflects on the Flying Lesbians and the function of women's festivals for the women's movement as "Rite of passage" and as "coming out party". Bassist Monella Savier has been quoted as saying that most of the band openly identified as lesbians, which helped fans to feel comfortable coming out, but the band never distanced themselves from heterosexual women. The Flying Lesbians performed in a stage revival in autumn 2007.

The Flying Lesbians were also represented at exhibitions such as "Homosexualitaet_en" (Homosexualities), a double exhibition in the Schwules Museum "Gay Museum" and the "Deutsches Historisches Museum" in Berlin 2015, - the first representative exhibition in Germany also in relation to the prominent official locations as well as the comprehensive claim and content: "Covering a total area of 1600 square meters, “Homosexuality_ies” documents 150 years of the history, politics and culture of homosexual women and men in Germany..." An audio station for songs of the Flying Lesbians was also set up at the exhibition.

In 2021, the band was featured in Bonn at the Haus der Geschichte der Bundesrepublik Deutschland in the exhibition ‘Hits & Hymns. Sounds of Contemporary History”, and in Leipzig from 2023 until July 2024 at the Haus der Geschichte der Bundesrepublik Deutschland – Zeitgeschichtliches Forum Leipzig. The exhibition also features an NDR television report by Alice Schwarzer on the Flying Lesbians, showing the band members during the recording of their LP in a Berlin studio in 1975.

In the rbb series “'Berlin – Fateful Years of a City”', Cillie Rentmeister speaks in the episode “'The Year 1975”' as a contemporary witness about the significance of the band’s name and the Flying Lesbians’ self-image as the “voice of the women’s movement”.

In 2026, the Flying Lesbians gained publicity through two new releases: In the English-speaking world, through Charlotte Anne Oakes’s comprehensive historical analysis "Rockin’ all over the world: Flying Lesbians and cross-border cultural transfers in the history of the Neue Frauenbewegung". This article examines how the Flying Lesbians used music to break down barriers and bring women together across national, cultural, and linguistic boundaries. Drawing on new interviews with former band members as well as contemporary accounts, the article demonstrates how the band became a key force in the 1970s in building international feminist connections, solidarity, and a shared sense of belonging.

On Instagram, a video by Hanna Hoppe, aka happahonne, went viral in no time at all, in which she rediscovers and presents the Flying Lesbians’ 1975 LP. The video was picked up by NDR Kultur, and Happahonne also posted a follow-up video which likewise achieved a wide reach.

== Members ==
The seven members of the band were:

- Danielle de Baat: guitar, bass guitar, vocals
- Monika Jaeckel: vocals, percussion († 2009)
- Gigi (Christa) Lansch: drums 1975 ff. († 2002)
- Monika Mengel: vocals, percussion
- Cillie Rentmeister: piano, vocals, harmonica, synthesizer
- M.S.: bass guitar, drums since 1975
- Christel Wachowski: guitar, percussion

Website: The seven Musicians

== Album ==
Their 1975 album was re-released as a CD in 2007. All lyrics and audiotracks of the songs are available on the band's website.

Side 1
No.	Title	Writer(s)	Length
1.	"Battered Wife"	Emily Pankhurst (collective pseudonym of the band, for copyright purposes)	3:02
2.	"Trebermädchen"	Emily Pankhurst	2:40
3.	"Arbeitslos"	Emily Pankhurst	4:05
4.	"für frau doktor a."	C. Rentmeister	4:14
5.	"frauen kommt her" & "frauen erhebt euch"	R. Stefan, E. Pankhurst & Emily Pankhurst	5:49

Side 2
No.	Title	Writer(s)	Length
1.	"l'm a lesbian, how about you?"	emily pankhurst	3:55
2.	"die bisexualität"	e.pankhurst / s.weyrich	3:31
3.	"wir sind die homosexuellen frauen. Music video with lyrics in English"	text und melodie: frauen aus der lesbencamp Sanguinet	3:35
4.	"matriarchats-blues"	emily pankhurst	5:35
5.	"shake it off"	emily pankhurst	6:04
