= The Meaning of Hitler =

1978 book by Raimund Pretzel

First edition (publ. Deutscher Bücherbund)

The Meaning of Hitler (German: Anmerkungen zu Hitler) is a 1978 book by the journalist and writer Raimund Pretzel, who published all his books under the pseudonym Sebastian Haffner. Journalist and military historian Sir Max Hastings called it 'among the best' studies of Hitler; Edward Crankshaw called it a 'quite dazzlingly brilliant analysis'.

The book analyzes the life and work of Adolf Hitler and is divided into seven chapters, each treating a different aspect of the man.

== Critical reception ==
The book was a best-seller in Germany and was awarded the Heinrich Heine Prize of the city of Dusseldorf, the Johann Heinrich Merck Prize, the Friedrich Schiedel Literature Prize and, posthumously in 2003, the Wingate Literary Prize. Golo Mann called it a 'witty, original and clarifying book... excellently suited for discussion in the upper classes of schools'. For Dieter Wunderlich the book is a 'linguistic masterpiece... not a biography but a concentrated reflection' by a 'wise and original' author.

== Synopsis ==
The book is divided into sections, each of which explores a different aspect of Hitler's life, personality and actions, which Haffner analyses.

=== Life ===
According to Sebastian Haffner, whereas Hitler's father made a modest success of life, Hitler, uniquely, failed drastically, then succeeded, then failed again. His life lacked education, occupation, love, friendship, marriage, parenthood. A readiness for suicide, of Geli Raubal, Eva Braun and himself, accompanied his career. All soft, lovable traits were missing from his character. He was also full of himself and unselfcritical. Hitler was an 'empty man' who filled himself with pride and hatred.

=== Achievements ===
Haffner argues that on gaining office in 1933, Hitler achieved many 'miracles' in economic and military policy. 90% of Germans approved. Had he died in 1938, he would have been remembered as 'one of the greatest Germans ever'. Few people noticed that he had dismantled the state and concealed the resultant chaos. In the long run, his achievement came to nothing.

=== Successes ===
Haffner states that all Hitler's foreign policy successes up to 1939 were gained without bloodshed. From then until 1941, he was also a successful war leader. His attack on Russia began his decline, and the pattern of failure, success, then failure again, is unique in history.

=== Misconceptions ===
Hitler, who believed in the constant Darwinian struggle for power between nations, turned the German state into a war machine, according to Haffner. For Hitler, the emergency was the norm. The Jews, being internationalists, took no part in this struggle between nations and had to be eliminated in a 'murder of the helpless'.

=== Mistakes ===
Hitler achieved the exact opposite of his stated goals, according to Sebastian Haffner. Germany did not become great, but was occupied and divided. The Jews were not eliminated, but created their own state. Communism was not defeated; instead, hegemony passed from Europe to the US and the USSR. European colonial empires dissolved: 'Today's world, whether we like it or not, is the work of Hitler.'

When Germany failed to meet his expectations for conquest, Hitler wished it to be annihilated.

=== Crimes ===
Haffner asserts that Hitler was a criminal who killed millions for his own gratification. He does not stand with Alexander or Napoleon but with Crippen or Christie. His victims included invalids, Roma, Poles, Russians and Jews. In December 1941 he abandoned the goal of world conquest in favour of the Final solution–exterminating the Jews.

=== Betrayal ===
From October 1944, Hitler deliberately prolonged the war by eliminating moderate opposition within Germany, in Haffner's opinion. In doing so he betrayed the German people and his 'fight to the finish' created a 'stirring legend' but destroyed Germany as a unified nation. The Ardennes offensive allowed the Russians to take Berlin, allowing Russia the upper hand in postwar Europe. Hitler said, 'the future belongs exclusively to the stronger nation from the east.'

One of the effects of this, Haffner claims, is that after Hitler, Germans no longer dare to be patriots, not knowing how much precisely this anti-patriotism is fulfillment of Hitler's last wish.

== Film adaptation ==
Promotional release poster

In 2020, filmmakers Michael Tucker and Petra Epperlein released their documentary, The Meaning of Hitler. Not an actual adaptation of Haffner's book, the filmmakers use it as a jumping off point and a place to constantly return to. Variety described the film as "a free-form, go-with-the-flow meditation on the Nazi era, made in the exploratory road-movie spirit of Werner Herzog’s recent documentaries," and The Hollywood Reporter wrote that the film "aims to pierce the aura of legend that has built up around Adolf Hitler and his Nazi regime," and calls it "An intellectual inquiry with burning present-day resonance, ... [and[ also a road trip through some of the darkest chapters of European history ... [which] shines a cleansing light on a mythology that stretches across a century. ...[The film] is an urgent warning about the blind spots that have led us to the present moment, and the need to understand the dynamic at work in Hitler's ascent." The 92 minute film had its world premiere with an online screening at the DOC NYC festival on 11 November 2020.

The film features several historians, experts, and commentators on German and Jewish history:

- Martin Amis, prize-winning author of The Zone of Interest
- Yehuda Bauer, historian and author of Rethinking the Holocaust
- Peter Theiss-Abendroth, psychiatrist
- Saul Friedlander, professor emeritus of history at UCLA
- Richard J. Evans, author of The Hitler Conspiracies: The Third Reich and the Paranoid Imagination
- Gavriel Rosenfeld, historian and author of The Fourth Reich: The Specter of Nazism from World War II to the Present
- Francine Prose, novelist
- Enno Lenze, journalist and museum curator
- Mark Benecke, a forensic biologist who worked on the identification of Hitler's skull and teeth
- Florian Kotanko, historian
- Klaus Theweleit, sociologist
- Winfried Nerdinger, historian
- Sarah Forgey, museum curator
- George Hamann
- Deborah Lipstadt, historian
- Jadwiga Korowaj,
- Koen Baert
- Ute Frevert
- Klaus Heyne
- Werner Müller, general manager of the Kempinski Hotel Berchtesgaden
- Mathias Irlinger
- Beate and Serge Klarsfeld, Nazi hunters
- Jan T. Gross, historian and sociologist
- Wojciech Mazurek

== See also ==
- List of Adolf Hitler books
- State collapse
- The Mind of Adolf Hitler
