= Sebastian Haffner =

German journalist and author (1907–1999)

- Haffner on book cover Germany: Jekyll & Hyde
- Born: Raimund Pretzel; 27 December 1907; Berlin, German Empire
- Died: 2 January 1999 (aged 91); Berlin, Germany
- Occupations: Journalist and historian
- Children: Oliver Pretzel; Sarah Haffner
- Writing career
- Subjects: Prussia, Otto von Bismarck, World War I, Nazi Germany, Adolf Hitler, World War II

Raimund Pretzel (27 December 1907 – 2 January 1999), better known by his pseudonym Sebastian Haffner, was a German journalist and historian. As an émigré in Britain during World War II, Haffner argued that accommodation was not only impossible with Adolf Hitler but also impossible with the German Reich with which Hitler had gambled. Peace could be secured only by rolling back history and restoring Germany to a network of smaller states. As a journalist in West Germany, Haffner's independence and penchant for provocation precipitated breaks with editors both liberal and conservative. His intervention in the Spiegel affair of 1962, and his contributions to the anti-fascist rhetoric of the student New Left, sharply raised his profile.

After parting ways with Stern magazine in 1975, Haffner produced widely read studies focused on what he saw as fateful continuities in the history of the German Reich (1871–1945). His posthumously published pre-war memoir, Geschichte eines Deutschen: Die Erinnerungen 1914–1933 ("History of a German", published in English as Defying Hitler: A Memoir) (2003) won him new readers in Germany and abroad. His novel Abschied ("Parting"), published in 2025 after Haffner's children found the manuscript in his desk, reached the top of Der Spiegel's best-seller list after its debut.

== Early life ==
=== School years ===
Haffner was born in 1907 as Raimund Pretzel in Berlin. During war years, 1914–18, he attended the primary school (Volksschule) of which his father Carl Pretzel was the principal. Of these years he recalls not the privations, but the army bulletins read with the excitement of a football fan following match scores. Haffner believed that it was from this experience of war by a generation of schoolboys as a "game between nations", more enthralling and emotionally satisfying than anything peace could offer, that Nazism was to draw much of its "allure": "its simplicity, its appeal to the imagination, and its zest action; but also its intolerance and its cruelty towards internal opponents".

After the war Haffner attended first a city-centre grammar school, the Königstädtisches Gymnasium Berlin in Alexanderplatz. Here he befriended children of the city's leading Jewish families in business and the liberal professions. They were precocious, cultivated and left-leaning. His adolescent politics, however, took a turn rightward after he moved, in 1924, to the Schillergymnasium in Lichterfelde heavily subscribed to by families in the military. Haffner was later to remark that: "My whole life has been determined by my experiences in these two schools".

=== Hitler and exile ===
After January 1933, Haffner witnessed as a law student the deployment of the SA as an "auxiliary police force" and, after the March Reichstag fire, their hounding of Jewish and democratic jurists from the courts. What shocked him most in these events was the complete absence of "any act of courage or spirit". In the face of Hitler's ascent it seemed as if "a million individuals simultaneously suffered a nervous collapse". There was disbelief, but no resistance.

Doctoral research allowed Haffner to take refuge in Paris, but unable to gain a foothold in the city he returned to Berlin in 1934. Having already published some shorter fiction as a serial novelist for the Vossische Zeitung, he was able to make a living writing feuilletons for style magazines where "a certain cultural aesthetic exclusivity was tolerated" by the Nazis. But the tightening of political controls and, more immediately, the pregnancy of his journalist girlfriend, classed as Jewish under the Nuremberg Laws, urged emigration. In 1938 Erika Schmidt-Landry (née Hirsch) (1899-1969) was able to join a brother in England, and Haffner, on a commission from the Ullstein Press, was able to follow her. They married weeks before the birth of their son Oliver Pretzel.

Britain's declaration of war against Germany on 3 September 1939 saved Haffner from deportation. As enemy aliens Haffner and his wife were interned, but in August 1940 they were among the first to be released from camps on the Isle of Man. In June, George Orwell's publisher Fredric Warburg had released Germany, Jekyll and Hyde, Haffner's first work in English and the first for which, to protect his family in Germany, he used the names he was to retain: Sebastian (from Johann Sebastian Bach) and Haffner (from Mozart's Haffner Symphony). In the House of Commons questions had been asked as to why the author of so important a book was being detained. Lord Vansittart described Haffner's analysis of "Hitlerism and the German problem" as "the most important [...] that has yet appeared".

== Political émigré ==
=== Germany: Jekyll and Hyde ===
In a polemic that rehearsed the themes of his later historical work, Haffner argued that Britain was naïve in declaring its "quarrel" to be with Hitler only and not with the German people. Hitler had "gained more adherents in Germany and come nearer to absolute power than anyone before him", and had done so by "more or less normal means of persuasion and attraction." This did not mean that "Hitler is Germany", but it was rash to assume that beneath Germany's vaunted unity there existed nothing but "discontent, secret opposition and repressed decency".

Germans had entered the war divided. Less than one in five were true devotees, the "real Nazis". No consideration, not even the "Bolshevik menace", could reconcile this "morally inaccessible" section of the New Germany to a stable Europe. The anti-Semitism that is their "badge" had outrun its original motive: the venting of Hitler's private resentments, the scapegoating of a minority as a safety valve for anti-capitalist sentiment. It functions rather as "a means of selection and trial", identifying those who are prepared, without pretext, to persecute, hunt and murder and thus be bound to the Leader by "the iron chains of a common crime". Hitler, in turn, (a "potential suicide par excellence") recognises only devotion to his own person.

A greater number of Germans—perhaps four in ten—wish only to see the back of Hitler and the Nazis. But "unorganised, dispirited and often in despair", very few identified with the submerged political opposition, itself divided and confused. Side-by-side they live with a roughly equal number of Germans who, dreading a further Versailles, bear "the surrender of personality, religion and private life" under Hitler as a "patriotic sacrifice". Through their generals, these Reich loyalists might eventually seek terms with the Allies, but Haffner urged caution. Anything less than a decisive break with the status quo ante would merely return to "a latent and passive state" the Reich's animating spirit of aggrandisement and "vulgar worship of force".

For there to be security in Europe, Haffner insisted (in original italics) that "[The] German Reich must disappear, and the last seventy-five years of Germany history must be erased. The Germans must retrace their steps to the point where they took the wrong path--to the year 1866" (the year when, on the battlefield of Königgrätz, Prussia removed Austrian protection from the smaller German states). Articulating a thesis he was to defend at length in his last (dictated) work, Von Bismarck zu Hitler (1987), Haffner maintained that "No peace is conceivable with the Prussian Reich which was born at that time, and whose last logical expression is no other than Nazi Germany". Germany should be returned to an historical pattern of regional states bound by confederal arrangements that are European and not exclusively national.

At the same time, Haffner admitted that part of the attraction for Germans would be that, repurposed as Bavarians, Rhinelanders and Saxons, they might escape Allied retribution. "We cannot", he reasoned, "both get rid of the German Reich and, identifying its 'Succession States', punish them for its sins". If the Allies wished the Reich mentality to die--"of which there was every possibility after the catastrophe of Nazism"—then the new states had to be given "a fair chance".

=== Churchill ===
There was a story that Churchill ordered every member of his war cabinet to read Haffner's book. If true, the regard would have been mutual. Of all his subsequent works, Haffner was to say that his short biography, Winston Churchill (1967), was his favourite. When in 1965 Churchill died, Sebastian Haffner wrote "it seemed as if not a mere mortal was buried, but English history itself". Yet Haffner was disappointed that Churchill did not take up his ideas for a German Freedom Legion, a German academy in exile and a German committee. The Prime Minister was prepared to use anti-Nazi Germans as advisors, technical experts and agents in the special forces, but there was to be no London equivalent of the Moscow-based "National Committee for a Free Germany". Neal Ascherson nonetheless believes it possible that some of Churchill's ideas about post-war Germany had "roots in sections of Haffner's book".

== Post-war journalism ==
=== Germany's division ===
In 1941, David Astor invited Haffner to join The Observer as political correspondent, while Edward Hulton recruited him as contributor to the popular Picture Post. The Observer's foreign editor and an influential opinion former in England, in 1948 Haffner became a naturalised British citizen. Through the Shanghai Club (named after a restaurant in Soho), he associated with left-leaning and emigre journalists, among them E. H. Carr, George Orwell, Isaac Deutscher, Barbara Ward, and Jon Kimche.

On his return from war service, David Astor took a more active part in editorial matters, and there were clashes of opinion. Following a McCarthy-era trip to the United States, Haffner had soured on the North Atlantic alliance. Along with Paul Sethe of Frankfurter Allgemeine Zeitung, he was unwilling to dismiss as bluff the March 1952 Stalin Note with its offer of Soviet withdrawal in return for German neutrality. In 1954 he accepted a financially generous offer to transfer to Berlin as The Observer's German correspondent.

In Germany, Haffner also wrote for the conservative national Die Welt, then edited by the Kapp Putsch veteran, Hans Zehrer. The publisher Axel Springer permitted discussion of neutrality (the "Austrian solution ") as the basis for a final German settlement, a prospect not definitively dismissed until the construction in September 1961 of the Berlin Wall. Haffner joined Springer in railing against the ineffectiveness of the western allied response to the sealing of the Soviet Bloc in Germany, a stance that occasioned his final break with Astor and The Observer.

Consistent with his post-Reich vision of 1940, Haffner was not, in principle, opposed to the existence of a second German state. In 1960 he had speculated on the future of the GDR as a "Prussian Free State" giving play, perhaps, to the National Bolshevist ideas of Ernst Niekisch. After the consolidation of the wall, and in a break with Axel Springer, Haffner was to see no alternative but to formally recognise a Soviet-Bloc East Germany. From 1969 he supported the Ostpolitik of the new Social-Democratic Chancellor, Willy Brandt.

=== Spiegel affair ===
On 26 October 1962, the Hamburg offices of Der Spiegel were raided and closed by police. The publisher, Rudolf Augstein, along with the weekly's two editors-in-chief and a reporter were arrested. Defence minister Franz Josef Strauss levelled accusations of treason (Landesverrat) in respect of an article detailing a NATO projection of "imaginable chaos" in the event of a Soviet nuclear strike and criticising the Government's lack of preparedness. In a statement he was later obliged to recant, Strauss denied himself initiating the police action.

Springer offered its presses, teletypes and office space so Der Spiegel could keep on publishing. But it was at the cost of any further access to Die Welt that Haffner, in the Süddeutsche Zeitung (8 November 1962), pronounced on the violation of press freedom and constitutional norms. Invoking the spectre of the republican collapse in 1933, Haffner argued that German democracy was in the balance. Identified with what was to be seen a key turning point in the culture of the Federal Republic away from deference demanded by the old Obrigkeitsstaat (authoritarian state) Haffner found a new, and more liberal, readership with the Frankfurter Allgemeine Zeitung, and with the weeklies Die Zeit and Stern magazine.

=== Student protest and anti-Springer campaign ===
Together with young writers and activists of a new post-war generation, Haffner believed that the Federal Republic was paying a price for Adenauer's pragmatic refusal to press for an accounting of Nazi-era crimes. With implicit reference to these, in Stern Haffner denounced as "a systematic, cold-blooded, planned pogrom" a police riot in West Berlin in which a student protester, Benno Ohnesorg, was shot dead.

On 2 June 1967, rallied by Ulrike Meinhof's exposure in the New Left journal konkret of German complicity in the Pahlavi dictatorship, students had demonstrated against the visit of the Shah of Iran. When Iranian counter-demonstrators, including agents of the Shah's intelligence service, attacked the students, the police joined the affray beating the students into side street where an officer fired his side arm. Contributing himself to konkret (later revealed to have been subsidised by the East Germans) Haffner wrote that "with the Student pogrom of 2 June 1967 fascism in West Berlin had thrown off its mask".

Increasingly focussed on the war in Vietnam ("the Auschwitz of the young generation"), many, including Haffner's daughter Sarah, directed their anger at his former employer, Axel Springer. After the attempted assassination of the socialist student leader Rudi Dutschke on 11 April 1968, Springer titles (Bild : "Students threaten: We shoot back", "Stop the terror of the Young Reds-Now!") were again accused of incitement. The Morgenpost responded to a protest blockade of its presses by itself proposing parallels to Kristallnacht: "back then the Jews were robbed of their property; today it is the Springer concern that is threatened".

=== Ulrike Meinhof ===
Haffner's contribution to this pushing of "differences to the top" ("Zuspitzung") was not appreciated by Brandt's Social Democrats or by Stern, and especially not after Meinhof took what she regarded as a next logical step in a struggle with "fascism". "Protest", she wrote, "is when I say I don’t like this. Resistance is when I put an end to what I don’t like.” On 19 May 1972, the Red Army Faction (the "Baader Meinhof Gang") bombed Springer's Hamburg headquarters injuring 17 people. A week before they had claimed their first victim, an American officer was killed by a pipe-bomb at U.S. military headquarters in Frankfurt am Main.

Like the novelists Heinrich Böll and Günter Grass, Haffner did not resist the temptation, in placing Meinhof's deeds in perspective, of a further swipe at Bild; "no one", he argued, had done more to plant "the seeds of violence" than Springer journalism. Yet Haffner expressed dismay at the number of people on the left he believed might, if asked, offer a fugitive Ulrike a bed for the night and breakfast. Nothing, he warned, could serve to discredit the left and a commitment to reform more than romanticising terrorism.

=== Celebrating the new liberalism ===
Haffner did not agree with the stringency of some of the security measures endorsed by the Brandt government. He objected to the 1972 Radikalenerlass (Anti-Radical Decree) that instituted a Berufsverbot barring certain public-sector occupations to persons with "extreme" political views. Marxists, he argued, must be able to be teachers and university professors "not because they are liberals, but because we are liberals" (Stern, 12 March 1972). However, Haffner no longer referred to police "pogroms" or to regime neo-fascism. In the 1960s the police may have beaten demonstrators on the streets, but no one, he countered, ever "heard of them having tortured them".

West Germany had changed. It may not have done enough to come to terms with the history of the Reich, but it had, in Haffner's view, "distanced itself from it with a light-footedness that no one had expected". The old authoritarianism, the sense of being a "subject" of the state, was "passé". The atmosphere had become "more liberal, more tolerant". Out of a nationalist, militaristic Volk there had emerged a comparatively modest, cosmopolitan ("weltbürgerlich") public. Yet for some of Haffner's readers, there was to be a further, and "absurd", volte face.

=== "Hands off" Franco's Spain ===
In October 1975, the editorial board of Stern refused a submission from Haffner on the grounds that it violated the magazine's commitment to a "democratic constitutional order and to progressive-liberal principles". In what was to prove its last use of capital punishment, on 27 September 1975 (just two months before Franco's death) Spain executed two members of the armed Basque separatist group ETA and three members of the Revolutionary Antifascist Patriotic Front (FRAP) for the murder of policemen and civil guards. Not only did Haffner refuse to join the general international condemnation, he appeared positively to defend the Spanish dictatorship. In a piece provocatively titled "Hands off Spain", he argued that Spain had not done badly in its thirty-six years under Franco. There may not have been political freedom, but there had been economic modernisation and progress.

To many, it appeared that Haffner had overplayed his reputation as a provocateur, an enfant terrible, someone who consistently sought "to dramatize, to push differences to the top". His readership was reportedly falling: he had already dropped from the Allensbach Institute's list of leading West-German journalists. Haffner allowed that he may have been moving right while Stern was moving left. In his last piece in Stern in October 1975, Haffner maintained he had no regrets in supporting Brandt's Ostpolitik or the regime change from Christian Democrat to Social Democrat. These had been "necessary". But he confessed to some disillusionment. The relaxation of Cold-War tensions had brought little in its wake (the GDR, if anything, had hardened "since we have been nice to them") and internally the BRD, the Federal Republic, had seen better times.

== From Bismarck to Hitler ==
At age 68 Haffner decided to devote himself to his popular commentaries on German history. Already some of his serialisations in Stern had been worked into best sellers. Die verratene Revolution (1968), Haffner's indictment of Social Democrats in the collapse of 1918 as Reich loyalists, ran into thirteen editions. Like all his work, it remained without footnotes, written for a popular audience (Haffner claimed to hate books you couldn't take to bed). Anmerkungen zu Hitler (1978) (published in English as The Meaning of Hitler) sold a million copies (Golo Mann called it a "witty, original and clarifying book ... excellently suited for discussion in the upper classes of schools". Enlarging on his wartime "psychogram of the Führer" in Germany: Jekyll and Hyde, the book placed Hitler in the shadow of the revolution Ebert and Noske betrayed.

Hitler, Haffner conceded, was no Prussian. Prussia had been "a state based on law", and its nationality policies had always "displayed noble toleration and indifference". But summarised in Haffner's final book, Von Bismarck zu Hitler (1987), the broader thesis remained. Through the "revolutions" of 1918 and of 1933, the Prussian-created Reich had endured with the same animating conviction. Born partly out of its geo-political exposure, it was that the Reich would either be a great power or collapse. Given their experience of this Reich, Haffner was confident that Germany's neighbours never would allow a successor: "alarm bells would go off if a new 80-million-strong power bloc were to rise up again at their borders."

== Death and family ==
In 1989/90, as Gorbachev scrambled his calculations and the Wall fell, Haffner reportedly feared that the Germans had been tempered less by the traumas of 1945—the lessons of which he had tried to draw out—than by consequences of their country's division. He was unsure whether the Germans might not again be gripped by national megalomania. According to his daughter Sarah, the peaceful course of unification pleased him but perhaps made him feel more keenly that he had outlived his time.

Haffner died on 2 January 1999, at the age of 91. Christa Rotzoll, a journalist whom Haffner had married after he had been widowed in 1969, predeceased him in 1995. Haffner was survived by his two children with Erika Schmidt-Landry. Sarah Haffner (1940–2018) was a painter and a feminist documentary-film maker. She believed that her own political involvement may have played some part in her father's engagement with the student movement in the 1960s. His son, Oliver Pretzel (1938- ), was Professor of Mathematics at Imperial College London. After his father's death he collated the memoir started early in 1939 but abandoned for the more urgent propaganda value of Germany: Jekyll & Hyde, and arranged for its publication as Geschichte eines Deutschen/Defying Hitler (direct translation of the title: History of a German). In 2025, Pretzel released a previously unpublished novel Haffner had written in 1932 called Abschied (Parting). The hand-written manuscript was discovered in Haffner's desk after his death.

=== In the recollection of Marcel Reich-Ranicki ===
Haffner's close friend, the Holocaust-survivor and literary critic Marcel Reich-Ranicki (1920–2013), remarked that Haffner's books were not only as instructive as his conversation, they were as entertaining. German journalists or historians who lived in exile in England or the United States worked for the press there, Reich-Ranicki suggested, wrote differently than before. Even after their return they wrote in a "clearer, more spirited" style that could be at once more factual and wittier. This, they found out, was a combination "also possible in German".

== Selected works ==
=== In English and English translation ===
- 1940 Germany: Jekyll & Hyde, Secker and Warburg, London. 2008, Germany, Jekyll & Hyde: A Contemporary Account of Nazi Germany. London: Abacus.
- 1941 Offensive Against Germany, London: Searchlight Books/Secker & Warburg.
- 1979 The Meaning of Hitler [Anmerkungen zu Hitler]. Cambridge, MA: Harvard University Press. ISBN 0-674-55775-1.
- 1986 Failure of a Revolution: Germany 1918-1919 [Die verratene Revolution – Deutschland 1918/19], Banner Press, ISBN 978-0-916650-23-0
- 1991 The Ailing Empire: Germany from Bismarck to Hitler [Von Bismarck zu Hitler: Ein Rückblick], New York: Fromm International Publishing, ISBN 978-0-88064-127-2
- 1998 The Rise and Fall of Prussia [Preußen ohne Legende], Phoenix Giants, ISBN 978-0-7538-0143-7
- 2003 Defying Hitler, a Memoir, [Geschichte eines Deutschen. Die Erinnerungen 1914–1933], London, Weidenfeld & Nicolson. ISBN 0-312-42113-3.

=== In German ===
- 1964 Die sieben Todsünden des deutschen Reiches im Ersten Weltkrieg. Nannen Press, Hamburg.
- 1967 Winston Churchill, Rowohlt Taschenbuch Verlag, Reinbek bei Hamburg. ISBN 3-463-40413-3
- 1968 Die verratene Revolution – Deutschland 1918/19, Stern-Buch, Hamburg. 2006, 13th edition: Die deutsche Revolution – 1918/19. Anaconda Verlag, 2008, ISBN 3-86647-268-4
- 1978 Anmerkungen zu Hitler, Fischer Taschenbuch, Frankfurt am Main. ISBN 3-596-23489-1. The Meaning of Hitler, Harvard University Press, Cambridge MA (1979). ISBN 0-674-55775-1. Published in English:
- 1979 Preußen ohne Legende, Gruner & Jahr, Hamburg. 1980 The Rise and Fall of Prussia, George Weidenfeld, London.
- 1980 Überlegungen eines Wechselwählers, Kindler GmbH, München. ISBN 3-463-00780-0
- 1982 Sebastian Haffner zur Zeitgeschichte. Kindler, Munich. ISBN 978-3463008394
- 1985 Im Schatten der Geschichte: Historisch-politische Variationen,. Deutsche Verlags-Anstalt, Stuttgart. ISBN 3-421-06253-6
- 1987 Von Bismarck zu Hitler: Ein Rückblick, Kindler, Munich. ISBN 3-463-40003-0.
- 1989 Der Teufelspakt: die deutsch-russischen Beziehungen vom Ersten zum Zweiten Weltkrieg. Manesse Verlag, Zurich. ISBN 3-7175-8121-X
- 1997 Zwischen den Kriegen. Essays zur Zeitgeschichte, Verlag 1900.ISBN 3-930278-05-7.

==== Published posthumously ====
- 2000 Geschichte eines Deutschen. Die Erinnerungen 1914–1933. Deutsche Verlags-Anstalt, Munich. ISBN 3-423-30848-6.
- 2000 Der Neue Krieg, Alexander, Berlin. ISBN 3-89581-049-5
- 2002 Die Deutsche Frage: 1950 – 1961: Von der Wiederbewaffnung bis zum Mauerbau, Fischer Taschenbuch, Frankfurt a. M.. ISBN 3-596-15536-3
- 2003 Schreiben für die Freiheit, 1942-1949. Als Journalist im Sturm der Ereignisse. Frankfurt-am-Main.
- 2004 Das Leben der Fußgänger. Feuilletons 1933–1938, Hanser, Carl GmbH & Co., Munich. ISBN 3-4462-0490-3
- 2016 Der Selbstmord des Deutschen Reichs, Fischer Taschenbuch, Frankfurt am Main. ISBN 3-596-31002-4
- 2019 The Ailing Empire: Germany from Bismarck to Hitler, Fromm International Publishing, ISBN 978-0-88064-127-2
- 2025 Abschied, ISBN 9783446284821
