= Cäcilia Rentmeister =

German art historian and culture scientist

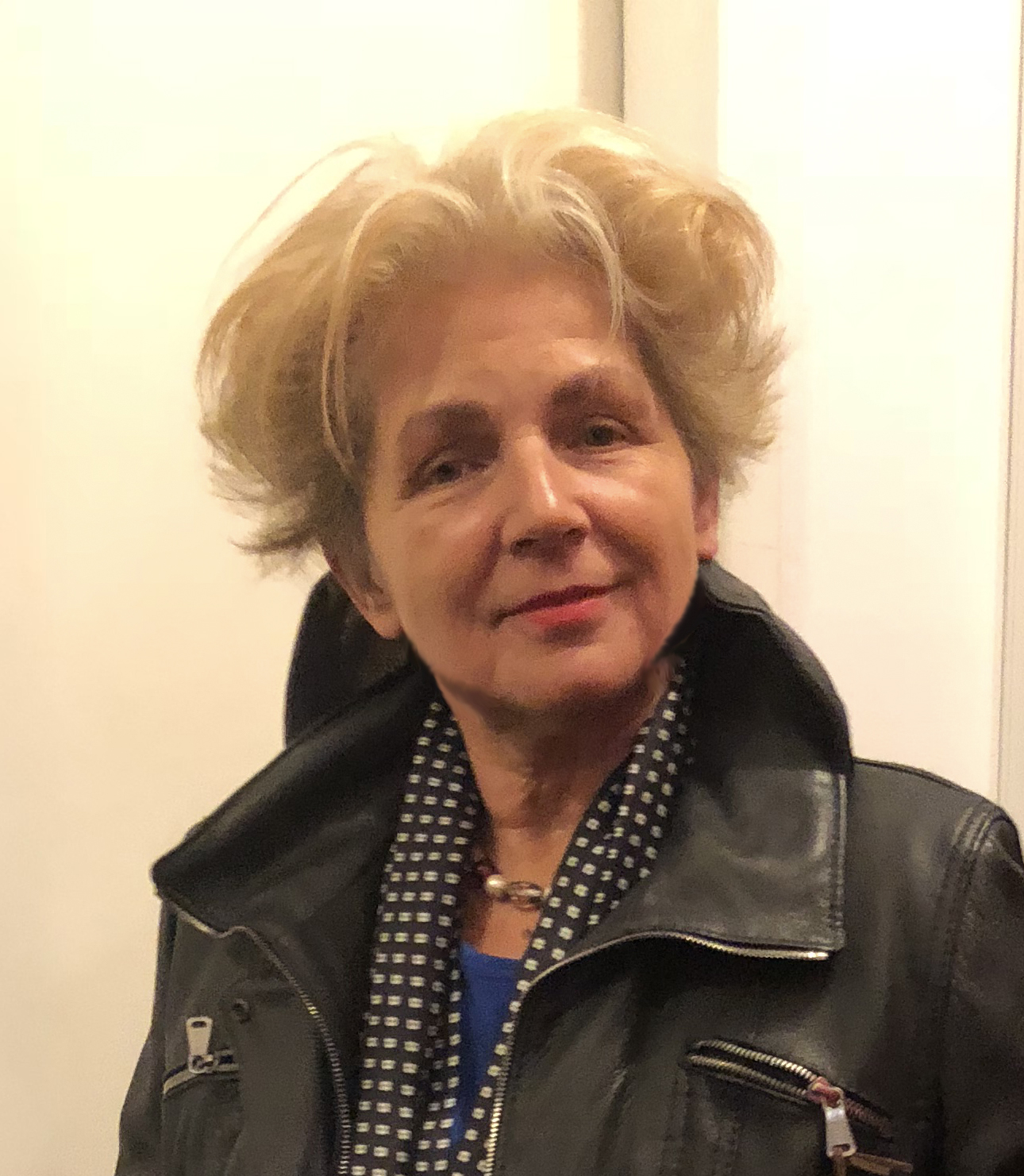
Rentmeister in 2018

Cäcilia (Cillie) Rentmeister (born 1948) is a German art historian, culture scientist and researcher of cultural conditions of women and of gender. In addition to studying the different realities in which men and women are living, she has concerned herself with the matriarchy.

== Biography ==
Born in Berlin, Rentmeister studied at the Free University of Berlin and the University of Cologne Art History, Archeology and American Studies. She received her PhD in 1980 at the University of Bremen. Rentmeister lives in Berlin and Brandenburg, and, since 1994, teaches at the University of Applied Sciences Erfurt at the Faculty of Applied Social Sciences "Cross-cultural Gender Studies" and "Interactive Media".

Rentmeister engaged since the early 1970s as activist in the Second-wave feminism. From 1974, she wrote articles and essays on feminist art history, archaeology and cultural studies, which were also published in other languages. From 1977 on she lectured in art schools, teacher colleges and universities in Berlin, Hamburg, and Bremen. She was one of the initiators of the interdisciplinary women's summer programs ("Frauen Sommeruniversität") at Technische Universität Berlin und the Free University Berlin, which were attended from 1976 to 1983 by about 30,000 women, and gave a sustained impetus for women's studies and gender research in all scientific disciplines.

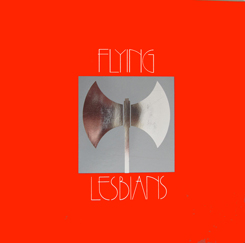
Cover from the LP of the Flying Lesbians

Cäcilia Rentmeister was keyboardist of the Flying Lesbians, the first women's rock band on the European continent. She reflected the significance of women's music in her writings on rituals and women's festivals.

In the 1970s and 1980s, Rentmeister also published critical essays on feminist aesthetics and women's art, sparking controversy, which she 1978 also debated internationally with Valie Export, Marlite Halbertsma, Ulrike Rosenbach and Lucy Lippard in the panel discussion organised by De Appel "Feministische Kunst International" in the Stedelijk Museum, Amsterdam, Netherlands.

In the 1980s, she published as a science writer for the German public radio, - among other issues on patriarchal motives of population growth in history and present, and on the New Age movement. Since 1973 she works with her partner, film director and writer Cristina Perincioli. They wrote together the screenplay for "Anna and Edith" - the first feature film about a lesbian relationship on German television ZDF in 1975. From 1985 on Rentmeister and Perincioli turned to the topic "computers and creativity". They developed models for artistic and educational work with multimedia, published and taught these concepts with the intention to interest women for the new digital technologies, whereas in the 1980s in German academia a computer-sceptical attitude still prevailed. From the 1990s Rentmeister worked as editor and project manager of websites on "sensitive" social and gender subjects that have been authored and produced by Cristina Perincioli (Two of them also in English versions)

As private pilot and member of the women pilots networks Ninety Nines International Organisation and the Federation of German Women Pilots Rentmeister is committed to promote the advancement of girls and women in aviation, through lectures, the media and by organising events for schoolgirls at the Girls’ Day. Melanie Katzenberger writes: "The pioneers of the skies belong into the textbooks, calls Caecilia Rentmeister. ...Girls must get the feeling: If she can, I can also..."

This important function of role models - from across the STEM sector - and that they should be introduced to girls at the earliest possible age of "five to twelve" is evidenced by Rentmeister's 2018 essay "This is your captain speaking. The Gender Factor in Aviation," in the companion volume to the exhibition "Violence and Gender" at the Military History Museum of the German Armed Forces in Dresden. Based on international studies, Rentmeister analyzes here the reasons why for decades the proportion of female pilots worldwide has stagnated at an average of only six percent, and how it could be increased. As further central factors, she discusses conscious and unconscious prejudices and stereotypes towards "women and technology", widespread among men as well as women. She provides positive examples of how to increase confidence in technical skills and makes the case for why women's participation in aviation is generally a win-win situation - for the women themselves as well as for business and society. Rentmeister also discusses these issues for the current German situation with professional women pilots, members of the Association of German Women Pilots, against the background of their specific, different biographical experiences and professional careers, in "55,000 Flying Hours - Five Professional and Commercial Women Pilots."

== Awards ==
- 2010 Rentmeister received the Teaching Award of the University of Applied Sciences Erfurt for her seminar "Political and Institutional Conditions of Social Work", and her course "Gender - Gender Relations: Differences, Equality, Equal Rights".

== Matriarchies: specific approaches of Rentmeister ==
With respect to archaeological reconstructions of historic matriarchies, especially as mirrored in 19th and early 20th centuries reception, Rentmeister developed her ideology-critical approach. One example for this realistic approach - opposing to esoteric ones - is her essay on "Why Are There So Many Allegories Female?" from 1976. In another critical essay she asked 1980: "How is politics made with notions of matriarchy?" and criticized, on the other hand, the blanket denial of matriarchy by contemporary European feminists. In her article „The Squaring of the Circle. The Seizure of Power by Men over Architectural Forms“, published 1979 in a special on „Women in Architecture – : Women's Architecture?“ in the German bauwelt, Rentmeister reconstructed architectural-spatial traces of matriarchies in ancient Europe. In another essay she asked 1980: "How is politics made with notions of matriarchy?" and criticized, on the other hand, the blanket denial of matriarchy by contemporary European feminists.

These and other early archaeological texts by Rentmeister were translated into several languages; they were discussed and referred to in the dedicated international and interdisciplinary discourses of the 1970s and 1980s, including architects like Margrit Kennedy and Paola Coppola Pignatelli, and novelists like Christa Wolf.

Sabine Herzog describes Rentmeisters approach: “The archaeologist and art historian Cillie Rentmeister published numerous works in the field of feminist cultural history and cultural criticism. In her book Women's Worlds – Men's Worlds of 1985, she describes the diversity of matriarchy in the past and present. Therefore a definition could only show a basic matriarchal pattern. Rentmeister ...lists some characteristics of matriarchies: In addition to matrilineality and matrilocality the avunculate and an extended family economy is characteristic, as well as a self-determined disposal of women over their bodies...”

Rentmeister defined as early as 1980 the term "matriarchy" explicitly not as inversion formula for patriarchy. According to Rentmeister "... there were and are certainly as many forms of matriarchy, as there are at present - and simultaneously – forms of patriarchy." In 1985, she emphasizes this statement with regard to ethnological findings.

1988 Rentmeister analysed the "Debate on Matriarchy" of the past two centuries in Germany, particularly in their significance for the first fifteen years of the second wave women's movement in Europe. She distinguishes, somewhat ironically, three phases between 1973–1988, and - backgrounded by her journeys to matriarchal societies in the 1980s - a certain "esoteric enthusiasm for matriarchy" and a "resuscitation of matriarchal rituals“ in Germany.

The question of the real existence of contemporary, modern matriarchies led Rentmeister from 1980 to the current to preoccupy with cultural anthropological research findings. She visited matrilineal, matrilocal societies, including Minangkabau in West Sumatra and Nayar in Kerala, South India. There she received - despite social change and crises - affirmative and confident statements by indigenous peoples of the special qualities, and even merits and social dividends its matriarchal institutions and ways of life for both sexes.

How these benefits correlate statistically with a comparatively high level in the Human Development-Indicators and Reproductive Health, Rentmeister describes 2007 in her essay "Development is female”. Illustrated by the examples of the Minangkabau and Nayar societies, she shows that empowerment, education and property in the hands of women contribute significantly to lower birth rates, to - in comparison to adjacent patriarchal communities - significantly less domestic violence, and for the society as a whole less poverty and better state of health can be observed.

== Books ==
- Computer and Creativity, co-authored with Cristina Perincioli, Cologne 1990
- Frauenwelten - Männerwelten (Women's Worlds - Men's Worlds), Opladen 1985
- Gender in Teaching and Didactics - Gender in Lehre und Didaktik (Co-Editor), Bern, Berlin, Brussels, Frankfurt/M., New York, Oxford, Vienna 2003
