= 1930 Temporary Anglo-Soviet Commercial Agreement =

1930 British-Russian economic policy agreement

The 1930 Temporary Anglo-Soviet Commercial Agreement was an agreement signed in London on April 16, 1930, to promote trade between the United Kingdom and the Union of Soviet Socialist Republics. It was signed by Foreign Secretary Arthur Henderson and Soviet Plenipotentiary in London Grigory Sokolnikov.

== Content ==
Temporary Commercial Agreement between His Majesty's Government in the United Kingdom and the Government of the Union of Soviet Socialist Republics — London, April 16, 1930,

His Majesty's Government in the United Kingdom of Great Britain and Northern Ireland and the Government of the Union of Soviet Socialist Republics, being mutually desirous to conclude as soon as possible a formal treaty of Commerce and Navigation between the United Kingdom of Great Britain and Northern Ireland and the Union of Soviet Socialist Republics, have meanwhile agreed upon the following temporary Agreement to serve as a modus vivendi pending the conclusions of such a Treaty.

=== Article 1 ===
For the purpose of developing and strengthening the trade relations between the United Kingdom of Great Britain and Northern Ireland and the Union of Soviet Socialist Republics, the Contracting Parties agree that without prejudice to any more favourable provisions contained below, all facilities, rights and privileges which in the United Kingdom and the Union of Socialist Republics respectively are or may be accorded with respect to trade to the subjects or citizens of juridical persons including companies constituted under the laws of such State or to the property of such subjects, citizens or juridical persons including companies of the Union of Soviet Socialist Republics and to the British subjects, British protected persons or juridical persons including companies of the United Kingdom respectively and to their property. The natural produce and manufactures of the United Kingdom shall enjoy in the United Soviet Socialist Republics and the natural produce and manufactures of the Union Socialist Republics shall enjoy in the United Kingdom, all the facilities, rights and privileges which are at present or may be hereafter accorded to the natural produce and manufactures of any other foreign country, in all that relates to the prohibition and the restriction of imports and exports, customs duties and charges, transport, warehousing, drawbacks and excise.

Nothing in the present Agreement shall apply to-

(a) the special provisions relating to trade contained in treaties which the Union of Soviet Socialist Republics has concluded, or may concluded, hereafter with those States, the entire territory of which on the 1. August, 1914, formed in all respects an integral part of the former Russian Empire or with the continental border States in Asia;

(b) the rights which have been accorded or may be accorded to any third country forming part of a customs union with the Union of Soviet Socialist Republics;

(c) the privileges which the Union of Soviet Socialist Republics has accorded, or may accord, to border States with respect to local trade between the inhabitants of the frontier zones.

NOTE.- The expression “British protected persons” in this Agreement is understood to mean persons belonging to any territory under His Majesty's protection or suzerainty or in respect of which a Mandate has been accepted by His Majesty. It is understood, however, that the stipulations of Article 1 do not apply to persons belonging to any such territory to which the present Agreement is not extended in accordance with the provisions of Article 5.

=== Article 2 ===
1.In view of the fact that. by virtue of the laws of the Union of Soviet Socialist Republics, the foreign trade of the Union is a State monopoly, His Majesty's Government in the United Kingdom agree to accord to the Government of the Union of Soviet Socialist Republics the right to establish in London a Trade Delegation, consisting of the Trade Representative of the Union of Soviet Socialist Republics and his two deputies, forming part of the Embassy of the

2. The head of the Trade Delegation shall be the Trade Representative of the Union of Soviet Socialist Republics in the United Kingdom. He and his two deputies shall. by virtue of paragraph 1 of the present Article, be accorded all diplomatic privileges and immunities, and immunity shall attach to the offices occupied by the Trade Delegation (Fifth Floor, East Wing, Bush House, Aldwych, London) and used exclusively for the purpose de fined in paragraph 3 of the present Article. No member of the staff of the Trade Delegation, other than the Trade Representative and his two deputies shall enjoy any privileges or immunities other than those which are. or maybe. enjoyed in the United Kingdom by officials of the State controlled trading organisations of other countries.

3. The functions of the Trade Delegation shall be:

(a) To facilitate and encourage the development of trade and commerce between the United Kingdom and the Union of Soviet Socialist Republics.

(b)To represent the interests of the Union of Soviet Socialist Republics in all that pertains to the foreign trade of the Union, and to control, regulate, and carry on such trade with the United Kingdom for and on behalf of the Union of Soviet Socialist Republics.

4. The Trade Delegation acting in respect to trade for and on behalf of the Union of Soviet Socialist Republics, the Government of the latter will assume responsibility for all transactions lawfully concluded in the United Kingdom by the Trade Representative or by persons duly authorised by him.

The Government of the Union of Soviet Socialist Republics will not, however, accept any responsibility for the acts of State economic organisations which, under the laws of the Union of Soviet Socialist Republics, are exclusively responsible for their own acts. except in cases where responsibility for such acts has been clearly accepted by the Trade Representative, acting for and on behalf of the Government of the Union of Soviet Socialist Republics.

5. The names of the Trade Representative and of the persons empowered to represent him shall be periodically published in the Board of Trade Journal and in addition shall in otherways be clearly made known to the public. The authority of these persons to represent the Trade Delegation shall continue until such time as notice to the contrary has been similarly published. 6. Any questions which may arise in respect of commercial transactions entered into in the United Kingdom by the Trade Delegation shall be determined by the Courts of the United Kingdom in accordance with the laws thereof.

7. The property of the Union of Soviet Socialist Republics in the United Kingdom shall be subject to such measures as may lawfully be taken to give effect to the Orders of the Courts of the United Kingdom, in so far as these Orders have been issued in connexion with transactions referred to in Paragraph 6, unless it is property which, according to international law, is immune from such measures as being necessary for the exercise of the rights of State sovereignty or for the official functions of the diplomatic or consular representatives of the Union of Soviet Socialist Republics.

=== Article 3 ===
The vessels of the Union of Soviet Socialist Republics and their cargoes and passengers and British vessels and their cargoes and passengers shall enjoy in the ports and territorial waters of the United Kingdom and of the Union of Soviet Socialist Republics respectively, the same rights, privileges and facilities as are enjoyed, or may be enjoyed hereafter by national vessels, their cargoes and passengers, or the vessels of the most favoured foreign country and their cargoes and passengers. The provisions of this Article does not extend to the coasting trade. The Contracting Parties reserve the right to limit to national ships the coasting trade between ports on the same coast. In regard to trade between ports not on the same coast they undertake to accord of the ships of each other treatment not less favourable than that accorded to the ships of any other foreign country. The provisions of the present Article shall not extend to:

(a) The application of special laws for the safeguarding, renewal and development of the national merchant fleet.

(b) Privileges granted to marines ports societies.

(c) Port services, including pilotage, towage and lifesaving and maritime assistance.

(d) Navigation on inland waters closed to foreign vessels in general, even though such navigation may be open to the vessels of limitrophe States.

Note 1. Nothing in this Article shall be deemed to confer on the vessels of either Party the right to carry on fishing operations in the territorial waters of the other or to land their catches in the ports of the other, nor shall it entitle British vessels to claim any privileges which are. or maybe. accorded by the Union of Soviet Socialist Republics to the fishing fleets of countries situated on the Arctic Ocean.

Note 2. Nothing in this Article shall affect the right of either Party to apply regulations in accordance with its national legislation for the transportation of immigrants, emigrants and pilgrims.

Note3. The provisions of the present Article do not apply to ships registered at the ports of His Majesty's self-governing Dominions and to their cargoes and passengers unless and until the present Agreement is extended to them in the manner provided in Article 4.

=== Article 4 ===
The provisions of the present Agreement may by mutual agreement be extended with any modifications agreed up onto any of His Majesty's self-governing Dominions (including any mandated territories administered by the Governments of such Dominions) or to India, by means of an exchange of notes between the Government of the Union of Soviet Socialist Republics and the Government of any such Dominion or of India.

=== Article 5 ===
The provisions of the present Agreement may also be extended on condition of reciprocity to any of His Majesty's colonies, possessions or protectorates or to any mandated territory administered by His Majesty's Government in the United Kingdom if a notification to that effect is given to the Government of the Union of Soviet Socialist Republics by His Majesty's Ambassador at Moscow or, in his absence, by His Majesty's Chargé d'Affaires. The Contracting Parties agree that in case a notification is made by His Majesty's Ambassador at Moscow (or in his absence, by His Majesty's Chargéd' Affaires) extending, in accordance with the provisions of the foregoing paragraph, the present Agreement to any of His Majesty's colonies, possessions, or protectorates or to any mandated territory administered by His Majesty's Government in the United Kingdom, the trading organisations of the Union of Soviet Socialist Republics shall be accorded the right to send to the respective colony, possession, protectorate or mandated territory, agents, who shall be acceptable to the Government concerned, for the purpose of carrying out the commercial transactions of the Union of Soviet Socialist Republics in such colony, possession, protectorate or mandated territory. It is understood that any such agent will in all cases be subject to the ordinary law relating to aliens in the colony, possession, protectorate or mandated territory in which he resides and will not be entitled to enjoy any diplomatic or consular privileges or immunities.

=== Article 6 ===
So long as in any territory referred to in Articles 4 or 5 which is not bound by the present Agreement the natural produce and manufactures of the Union of Soviet Socialist Republics are accorded treatment as favourable as that accorded to the natural produce and manufactures of any other foreign country, the natural produce and manufactures of such territory shall enjoy in the Union of Soviet Socialist Republics complete and unconditional most favoured nation treatment. At the same time, however, the Government of the Union of Soviet Socialist Republics reserves to itself the right to denounce this Article at any time in respect of any particular Dominion or of India.

=== Article 7 ===
The present Agreement comes into force on this day and shall remain in force until the coming into force of a commercial treaty between the Union of Soviet Socialist Republics and the United Kingdom subject, however, to the right of either Party at any time to give notice to the other to terminate the Agreement which shall then remain in force until the expiration of six months from the date on which such notice is given. So far as concerns any of His Majesty's self-governing Dominions, India or any colony, possession, protectorate or mandated territory in respect of which notes have been exchanged in virtue of Article 4 above or in respect of which notice of the application of his Agreement has been given in virtue of Article 5 above, the Agreement may be terminated separately by either Party at the end of the sixth month or at any time subsequently on six months' notice to that effect being given either by or to His Majesty's Ambassador at Moscow or. in his absence, by or to His Majesty's Chargé d'Affaires. In witness where of the undersigned, duly authorised for that purpose, have signed the present Agreement, and have affixed there to their seals. Done in duplicate at London in the English language the Sixteenth day of April, One Thous and Nine Hundred and Thirty.

A translation shall be made into the Russian language as soon as possible and agreed upon between the Contracting Parties. Both texts shall then be considered authentic for all purposes.

=== Protocol ===
In concluding the present Agreement the Contracting Parties are animated by the intention to eliminate from their economic relations all forms of discrimination. They accordingly agree that. so far as relates to the treatment accorded by each Party to the trade with the other, they will be guided in regard to the purchase and sale of goods, in regard to the employment of shipping and in regard to all similar matters by commercial and financial considerations only and. subject to such considerations, will adopt no legislative or administrative action of such a nature as to place the goods, shipping, trading organisations and trade in general of the other Party in any respect in a position of inferiority as compared with the goods, shipping and trading organisations of any other foreign country. In accordance with the above principle, trade between the Union of Soviet Socialist Republics and the United Kingdom shall be eligible for consideration on the same basis as trade between the United Kingdom and other foreign countries in connexion with any legislative or administrative measures which hare or may be taken by His Majesty's Government in the United Kingdom for the granting of credits to facilitate such trade. That is to say that in considering any given transaction regard shall be had to financial and commercial considerations only.

=== Additional Protocol ===
With reference to paragraph 6 of Article 2 it is understood that the privileges and immunities conferred on the head of the Trade Delegation and his two deputies by paragraph 2 of Article 2 of the present Agreement shall not be claimed in connexion with any proceedings before the Courts of the United Kingdom arising out of commercial transactions entered in to in the United Kingdom by the Trade Delegation of the Union of Soviet Socialist Republics.

== Soviet wheat exports and Holodomor ==
In 1928, with 190 million Bushels, the UK was the world's voracious importer of wheat, of which 50 percent came from Canada and Australia.

In 1931, on the eve of the Holodomor, the United Kingdom become the principal buyer of Russian-Ukrainian wheat.

1931 the Soviet Union had become Britain's chief supplier of wheat. Imports rose from zero in 1929 to over 5 million bushels in the first three months of 1931

After the signing of the Ottawa Agreements with the Dominions of the Commonwealth in the summer of 1932, Britain was obliged to abandon the Anglo-Soviet trade agreement of 1930. This decision, prompted primarily by pressure from the Canadian wheat and timber lobby, was announced on 17 October 1932.

== See also ==
- Metro-Vickers Affair
- Anglo-Soviet Trade Agreement
- Anglo-Soviet Agreement of 1941
- Anglo-Soviet relations
- Anglo-Soviet Treaty of 1942
