= Declaration of St James's Palace =

Statement of Allied goals in WW2

First Inter-Allied Conference Declaration of St James's Palace
- Host country: United Kingdom
- Date: 12 June 1941; 85 years ago
- Cities: London
- Venues: St James's Palace
- Participants: See full list: United Kingdom; Canada; Australia; New Zealand South Africa; Belgian government in exile; Czechoslovak provisional government-in-exile; Greek government-in-exile; Luxembourg government-in-exile; Dutch government-in-exile; Norwegian government-in-exile; Polish government-in-exile; Yugoslav government-in-exile; (Free France) Free French National Committee
- Precedes: Atlantic Conference

Key points
- No separate peace with the Axis powers; Commitment to a peace based on "willing co-operation of free peoples"

The Declaration of St James's Palace, or London Declaration, was the first joint statement of goals and principles by the Allied Powers during World War II. The declaration was issued after the first Inter-Allied Conference at St James's Palace in London on 12 June 1941. Representatives of the United Kingdom, the four co-belligerent Commonwealth Dominions (Canada, Australia, New Zealand, and South Africa), the eight governments in exile (Belgium, Czechoslovakia, Greece, Luxembourg, the Netherlands, Norway, Poland, Yugoslavia) and Free France were parties to the declaration. It stated the Allies' commitment to continue the war against the Axis Powers (Germany and Italy) and established principles to serve as the basis of a future peace.

== Background ==
After the Battle of France, the exiled governments of Poland, Belgium, the Netherlands, and Luxembourg established themselves in London and began to work with the British to coordinate resistance activities and carry on the fight. Charles de Gaulle's Appeal of 18 June likewise signaled the beginning of the Free French movement. By 1941, the Czech National Liberation Committee under Edvard Beneš also won recognition as the Provisional Czechoslovak Government as it cooperated ever closer with Britain.

The Balkans campaign ended on 1 June 1941, leaving both Greece and Yugoslavia under Axis occupation. Both of their governments went into exile; the government of Peter II of Yugoslavia joined the Western Allied exiles in London, while the Greek government of George II set up in Cairo.

London, as the capital of the only belligerent power in Europe not under Axis occupation, became the center of Allied diplomatic activity. By June 1941, the city had already been subjected to 11 months of combat in the Battle of Britain and subsequent London Blitz.

== Content and impact ==
The Declaration of St James's Palace made three resolutions. In the first, the parties affirmed their alliance, pledging to assist one another in the war against Germany and Italy and committing "the utmost of their respective capacities". The second pledged that the Allies would enter into no separate peace, stating that there could be no peace until the threat of Axis domination was past. The third resolution committed the Allies to the principle of a peace based on the "willing cooperation of free peoples" in which "all may enjoy economic and social security."

The declaration was the first statement by the Allied Powers expressing a vision for a postwar world order. In August of 1941, Britain and the United States laid out this vision in a more detailed form in the Atlantic Charter. In September, a second Inter-Allied meeting, which now included Soviet ambassador Ivan Maisky following the Anglo-Soviet Agreement, issued a resolution endorsing the Charter. In January 1942 a still larger group of nations issued the Declaration by United Nations, endorsing the same principles initially put forward at St James's and pledging to jointly resist the Axis Powers.

== See also ==
- British Empire in World War II
- Diplomatic history of World War II
- German-occupied Europe
- History of the United Nations
- List of Allied World War II conferences
