= Declaration by United Nations =

Treaty forming the Allies during World War II

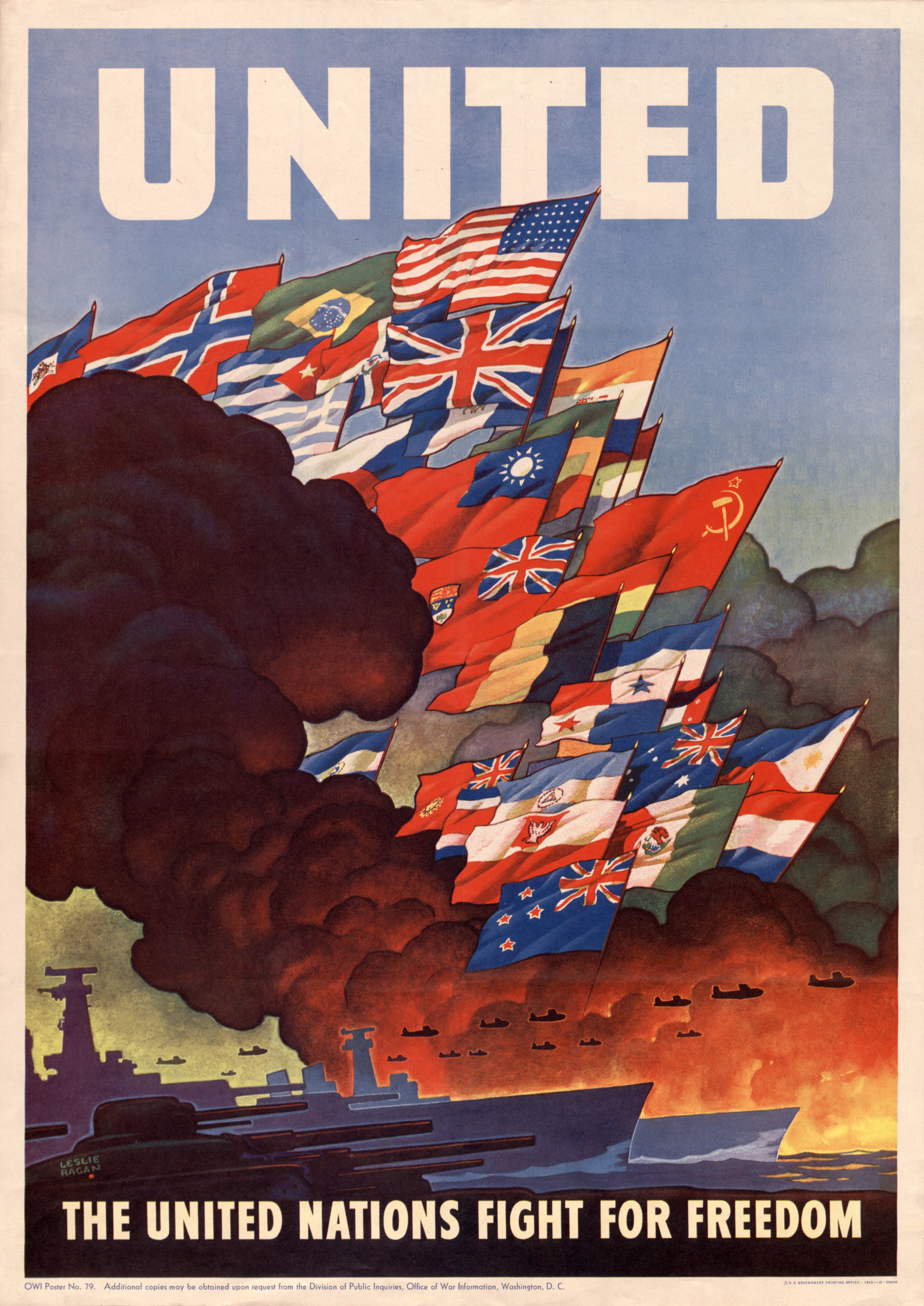
"The United Nations Fight for Freedom" — Office of War Information poster, 1943

The Declaration by United Nations was the main treaty that formalized the Allies of World War II and was signed by 47 national governments between 1940 and 1950. On 1 January 1942, during the Arcadia Conference in Washington D.C., the Allied "Big Four"—the United States, the United Kingdom, the Soviet Union, and China—signed a short document which later came to be known as the United Nations Declaration, and the day after the representatives of 22 other nations added their signatures.

The other original signatories on the next day (2 January 1942) were the four dominions of the British Commonwealth (Australia, Canada, New Zealand, and South Africa); eight European governments-in-exile (Belgium, Czechoslovakia, Greece, Luxembourg, Netherlands, Norway, Poland, and Yugoslavia); nine countries in the Americas (Costa Rica, Cuba, Dominican Republic, El Salvador, Guatemala, Haiti, Honduras, Nicaragua, and Panama); and one non-independent government, the British-appointed Government of India.

The Declaration by United Nations became the basis of the United Nations (UN), which was formalized in the UN Charter, signed by 50 countries on 26 June 1945.

== Background ==
The Allies of World War II first expressed their principles and vision for the post-World War II world in the Declaration of St. James's Palace agreed at the First Inter-Allied Conference in June 1941. The Anglo-Soviet Agreement was signed in July 1941 forming a military alliance between the United Kingdom and the Soviet Union. The two main principles of these agreements, a commitment to the war and renunciation of a separate peace, formed the basis for the later Declaration by United Nations.

The Atlantic Charter was agreed a month later between Britain and the United States, to which the other Allies, now including the Soviet Union, agreed to adhere at the Second Inter-Allied Conference in September.

== Drafting ==
The Declaration by United Nations was drafted during the Arcadia Conference at the White House on December 29, 1941, by US President Franklin D. Roosevelt, British Prime Minister Winston Churchill, and Roosevelt's aide Harry Hopkins. It incorporated Soviet suggestions but left no role for France, which was under German occupation at the time.

Roosevelt coined the term "United Nations" to describe the Allied countries and suggested it as an alternative to the name "Associated Powers" (the U.S. was never formally a member of the Allies of World War I but entered the war in 1917 as a self-styled "Associated Power"). Churchill accepted it and noted that the phrase was used by Lord Byron in the poem Childe Harold's Pilgrimage (Stanza 35).

The parties pledged to uphold the Atlantic Charter, to employ all their resources in the war against the Axis powers, and not to seek to negotiate a separate peace with any of them; similarly, the Allied nations had agreed not to negotiate a separate peace with the Central Powers in World War I.

One major change from the Atlantic Charter was the addition of a provision for religious freedom, which Stalin approved after Roosevelt insisted.

The text of the declaration affirmed the signatories' perspective "that complete victory over their enemies is essential to defend life, liberty, independence, and religious freedom, and to preserve human rights and justice in their own lands as well as in other lands, and that they are now engaged in a common struggle against savage and brutal forces seeking to subjugate the world". The principle of "complete victory" established an early precedent for the Allied policy of obtaining the Axis' powers' "unconditional surrender". The defeat of "Hitlerism" constituted the overarching objective, and represented a common Allied perspective that the totalitarian militarist regimes ruling Germany, Italy, and Japan were indistinguishable.

The declaration, furthermore, was consistent with the Wilsonian principles of self determination, thus linking U.S. war aims in both world wars.

== Adoption ==
The Declaration was officially signed on 1 January 1942 by the Big Four —the United States, the United Kingdom, the Soviet Union, and China—followed the next day by representatives of 22 other governments. The term "United Nations" became synonymous during the war with the Allies and was considered to be the formal name that they were fighting under.

The Declaration by United Nations became the basis of the modern United Nations. By the end of the war, 21 other states had acceded to the declaration, including the Philippines (a non-independent, US commonwealth at the time), France, every Latin American state except Argentina, and the various independent states of the Middle East and Africa. Although most of the minor Axis powers had switched sides and joined the United Nations as co-belligerents against Germany by the end of the war, they were not allowed to accede to the declaration. Occupied Denmark did not sign the declaration, but because of the vigorous resistance after 1943, and because the Danish ambassador Henrik Kauffmann had expressed the adherence to the declaration of all free Danes, Denmark was nonetheless invited among the allies in the San Francisco Conference in March 1945.

== Text ==
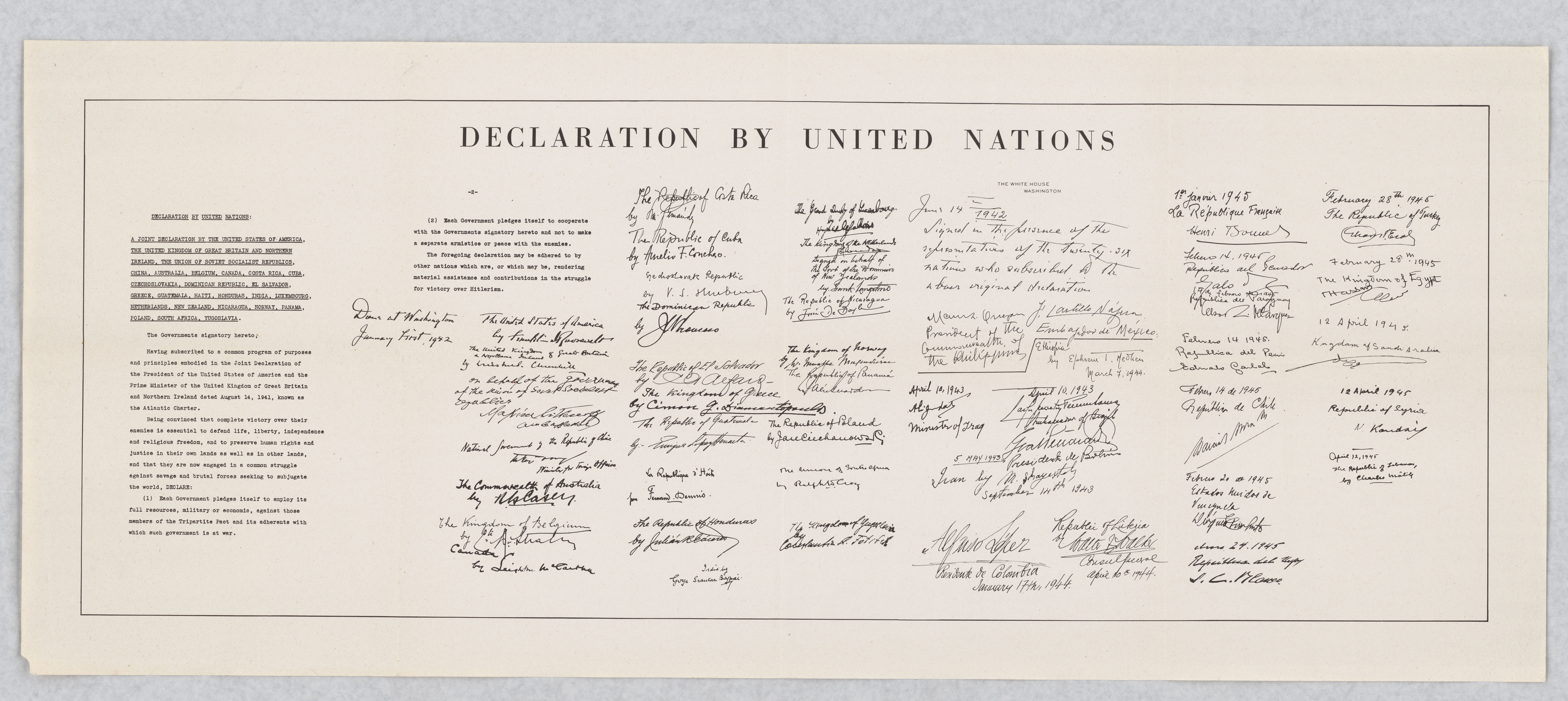
Declaration by United Nations

A JOINT DECLARATION BY THE UNITED STATES OF AMERICA, THE UNITED KINGDOM OF GREAT BRITAIN AND NORTHERN IRELAND, THE UNION OF SOVIET SOCIALIST REPUBLICS, CHINA, AUSTRALIA, BELGIUM, CANADA, COSTA RICA, CUBA, CZECHOSLOVAKIA, DOMINICAN REPUBLIC, EL SALVADOR, GREECE, GUATEMALA, HAITI, HONDURAS, INDIA, LUXEMBOURG, NETHERLANDS, NEW ZEALAND, NICARAGUA, NORWAY, PANAMA, POLAND, SOUTH AFRICA, YUGOSLAVIA

The Governments signatory hereto,

Having subscribed to a common program of purposes and principles embodied in the Joint Declaration of the President of the United States of America and the Prime Minister of Great Britain dated August 14, 1941, known as the Atlantic Charter,

Being convinced that complete victory over their enemies is essential to defend life, liberty, independence and religious freedom, and to preserve human rights and justice in their own lands as well as in other lands, and that they are now engaged in a common struggle against savage and brutal forces seeking to subjugate the world,

Declare:

(1) Each Government pledges itself to employ its full resources, military or economic, against those members of the Tripartite Pact and its adherents with which such government is at war.

(2) Each Government pledges itself to cooperate with the Governments signatory hereto and not to make a separate armistice or peace with the enemies.

The foregoing declaration may be adhered to by other nations which are, or which may be, rendering material assistance and contributions in the struggle for victory over Hitlerism.

== Signatories ==
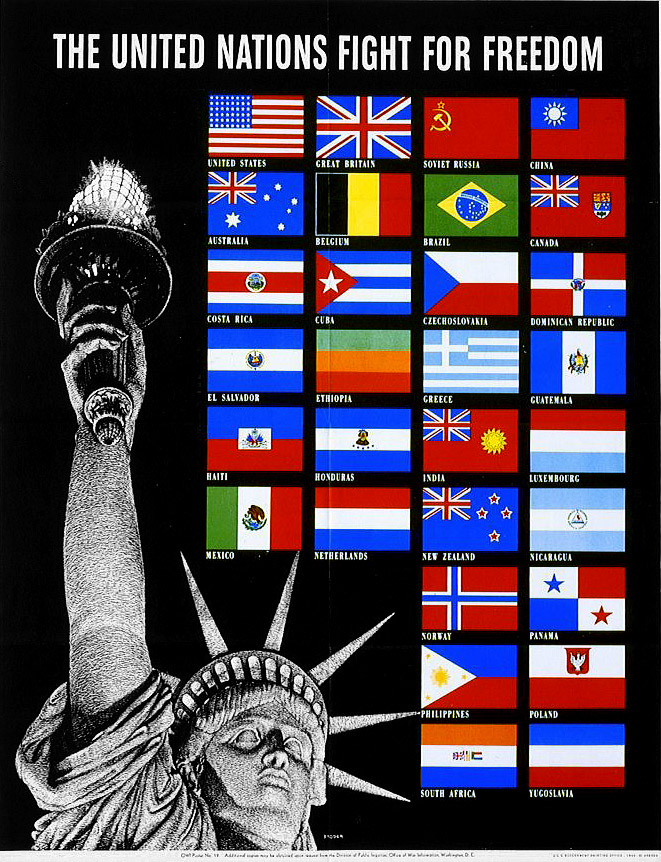
Wartime poster for the United Nations, created by the US Office of War Information

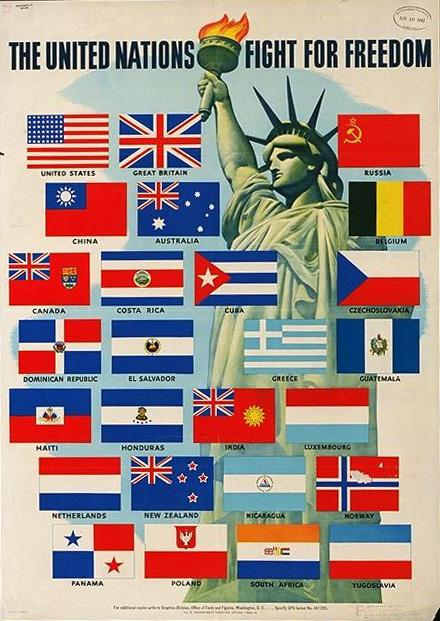
Wartime poster for the Allies of World War II, created in 1942 by the US Office of War Information, showing the 26 members of the alliance

Original signatories
Big Four	United States; United Kingdom; Soviet Union; China
Dominions of the British Commonwealth	Australia; Canada; New Zealand; South Africa
Independent countries in the Americas	Costa Rica; Cuba; Dominican Republic; El Salvador; Guatemala; Haiti; Honduras; Nicaragua; Panama
European governments-in-exile	Belgium; Czechoslovakia; Greece; Luxembourg; Netherlands; Norway; Poland; Yugoslavia
Non-independent subjects of the British Empire	India
Later signatories
1942	Ethiopia; Brazil; Mexico; Philippines (non-independent US Commonwealth in 1935-1946)
1943	Bolivia; Colombia; Iran; Iraq
1944	France; Liberia
1945	Chile; Ecuador; Egypt; Lebanon; Paraguay; Peru; Saudi Arabia; Syria; Turkey; Uruguay; Venezuela

== See also ==
- Allied technological cooperation during World War II
- Declarations of war during World War II
- Diplomatic history of World War II
- History of the United Nations
- List of Allied World War II conferences
- 1945 United Nations Conference on International Organization resulted in the creation of the Charter of the United Nations
