= New Atlanticism =

Modern interpretation of Atlanticism

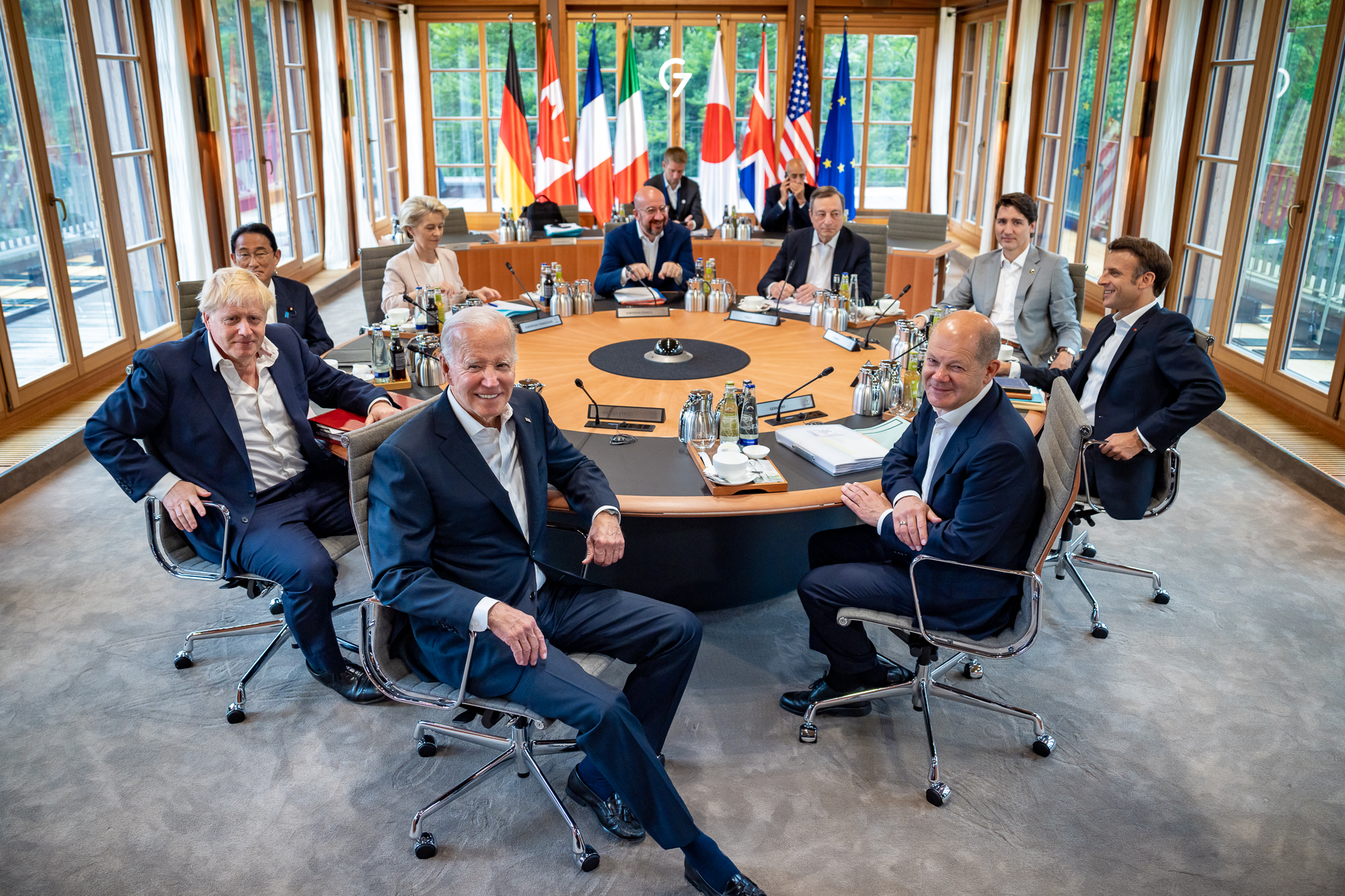
G7 leaders during a working session in the Bavarian Alps, June 2022.

New Atlanticism, also referred to as neo-Atlanticism, is a foreign policy doctrine that advocates for a modernized partnership between North America and Europe. The concept largely expands upon the Cold War-era ideology of Atlanticism, but differs by promoting the incorporation of non-military dimensions into the transatlantic alliance: technology standards, economic supply chain security, climate change policy, and the broader defense of the liberal international order against authoritarianism.

In June 2021, U.S. president Joe Biden and UK prime minister Boris Johnson signed the New Atlantic Charter to formally outline the foreign policy objectives of the "Free World" amid its strategic competition with Russia and China.

== Background ==
The term "New Atlanticism" was first coined to refer to Italian foreign policy during the 1950s and 1960s. Proposed by Christian Democratic politicians such as Amintore Fanfani, Giovanni Gronchi, and Aldo Moro, the doctrine sought to increase Italy's defense posture in support of the Western alliance and against the Soviet Union.

In 1973, Secretary of State Henry Kissinger proposed a "new Atlantic Charter" to strengthen European–United States relations and to incorporate Japan into the international community.

In 1989, Secretary of State James Baker proposed the concept of "New Atlanticism" which called for the creation of a transatlantic political institution to address humanitarian crises, socioeconomic issues, as well as cultural and environmental concerns.

== History ==
Following the fall of communism and the dissolution of the Soviet Union, the term was originally used to described the eastward expansion of NATO and the European Union during the 1990s and 2000s. At the 2004 German Marshall Fund conference in Istanbul, NATO secretary general Jaap de Hoop Scheffer explicitly utilized the phrase "New Atlanticism" to denote an alliance shifting away from a Euro-centric defense toward global operations and asymmetric threat management.

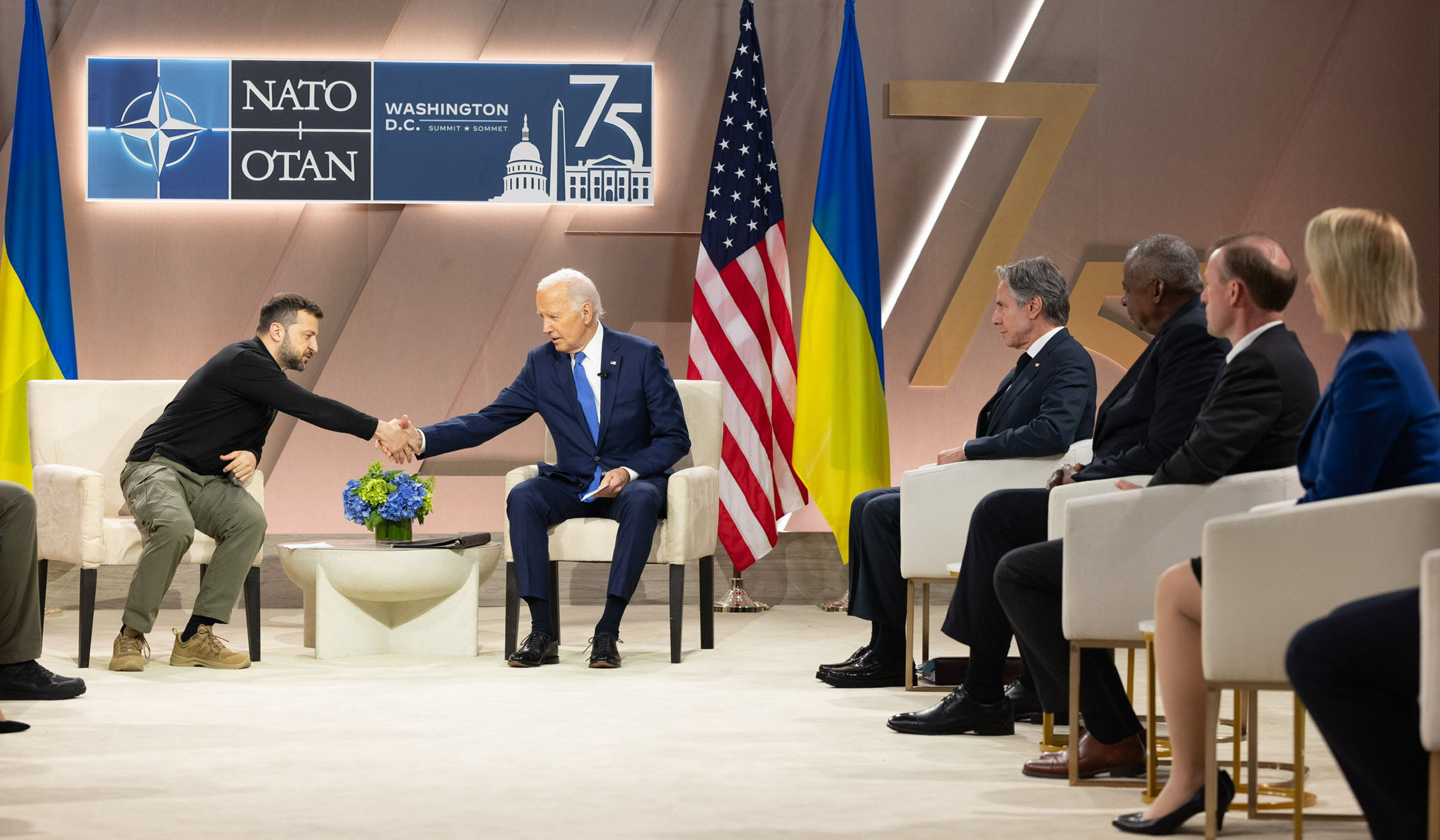
President Biden and President Volodymyr Zelenskyy at the 2024 NATO Summit in Washington, D.C., July 2024.

During the Biden administration, New Atlanticism remerged as the primary ideology to engage and combat Russian aggression. A 2024 study by the Eurasia Group across the United States, United Kingdom, France, and Germany, found widespread support for de-escalation in the Russo-Ukrainian war and for increased European strategic autonomy.

== Ideology ==
New Atlanticism focuses on revitalizing the strategic and military alliance between Europe and the United States to meet contemporary global challenges. Shifting from a reliance on historical sentiment, the ideology emphasizes a pragmatic partnership driven by strategic consensus. According to Ambassador John C. Kornblum, Europe's expanding economic and cultural influence requires a modernized defense framework, which can uniquely be secured by reinforcing its military ties with the U.S. through NATO.

== New Atlantic Charter ==
The New Atlantic Charter, a bilateral agreement signed by President Biden and Prime Minister Johnson in 2021, set out the aims of the New Atlanticism doctrine:

- To defend the principles and institutions of democracy and open societies
- To strengthen and adapt the institutions, laws and norms that sustain international co-operation
- To remain united behind principles of sovereignty, territorial integrity and peaceful resolution of disputes
- To harness and protect the countries' innovative edge in science and technology
- To affirm the shared responsibility to maintain collective security and international stability, including against cyber threats; and to declare the countries' nuclear deterrents to the defense of NATO
- To continue building an inclusive, fair, climate-friendly, sustainable, rules-based economy
- To prioritize climate change in all international action
- To commit to continuing to collaborate to strengthen health systems and advance health protections

== Criticism ==
According to critics like Richard Sakwa, New Atlanticism is characterized as utilizing a "rules-based international order" to justify its geopolitical expansionism. He also argues the doctrine re-divides the European continent along strict bloc lines, contributing to heightened tensions between Europe and Russia.

== See also ==
- Atlanticism
- Special Relationship
- Strategic autonomy
