= Modus vivendi =

Arrangement that allows conflicting parties to coexist in peace

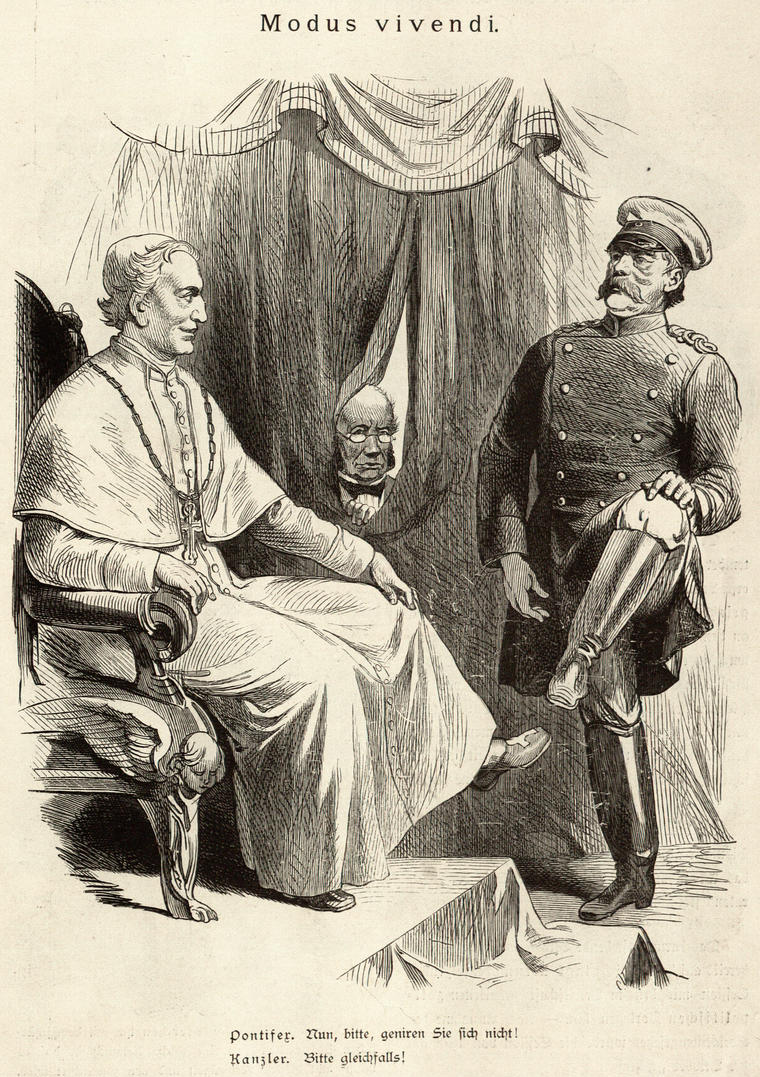
A "Modus vivendi" from Kladderadatsch, 1878, to Pope Leo XIII and Otto von Bismarck.

Modus vivendi (plural modi vivendi; Latin pronunciation: [ˈmɔ.dʊs wɪˈwɛn.dɪ]) is a Latin phrase that means "mode of living" or "way of life". In international relations, it often is used to mean an arrangement or agreement that allows conflicting parties to coexist in peace. In science, it is used to describe lifestyles.

Modus means "mode", "way", "method", or "manner". Vivendi means "of living". The phrase is often used to describe informal and temporary arrangements in political affairs. For example, if two sides reach a modus vivendi regarding disputed territories, despite political, historical or cultural incompatibilities, an accommodation of their respective differences is established for the sake of contingency.

In diplomacy, a modus vivendi is an instrument for establishing an international accord of a temporary or provisional nature, intended to be replaced by a more substantial and thorough agreement, such as a treaty. Armistices and instruments of surrender are intended to achieve a modus vivendi. One example of a modus vivendi is the 1930 Temporary Anglo-Soviet Commercial Agreement.

== Examples ==
The term often refers to Anglo-French relations from the 1815 end of the Napoleonic Wars to the 1904 Entente Cordiale.

On 7 January 1948, the United States, Britain and Canada, concluded an agreement known as the modus vivendi, that allowed for limited sharing of technical information on nuclear weapons which officially repealed the Quebec Agreement.

== See also ==
- Latin phrases
- Modus operandi – Habits of working
- Modus ponens – Rule of logical inference
- Modus tollens – Rule of logical inference
