= Anglo-Soviet Agreement =

1941 alliance between the United Kingdom and Soviet Union

The Anglo-Soviet Agreement was a declaration signed by the United Kingdom and the Soviet Union on 12 July 1941, shortly after the beginning of Operation Barbarossa, the German invasion of the Soviet Union. In the agreement, the UK and the Soviet Union pledged to cooperate in the war against Nazi Germany and not to make a separate peace with Germany.

The agreement was to be valid until the end of war against Nazi Germany. The two principles of the agreement, a commitment to mutual assistance and renunciation of a separate peace, were similar to those in the earlier Declaration of St James's Palace and the later Declaration by United Nations.

== Background ==
The Soviet Union and the Third Reich signed the Molotov–Ribbentrop Pact, a non-aggression pact between the two nations, on 23 August 1939. A secret part of the agreement defined the areas of Eastern Europe that fell into their respective spheres of influence. On 1 September 1939, Germany invaded Poland and, on 17 September, the USSR invaded Poland from the east. The UK had declared war on Germany on 3 September. The Soviet Union declared itself neutral in the war between the UK and Germany.

On 22 June 1941 Germany began an attack along the whole length of its border with the USSR from the Baltic states to Ukraine. The Soviet forces were unprepared and the attacks paralysed the Soviet command system and German forces advanced rapidly into Soviet territories.

== Negotiations ==
Initial discussions about an alliance were characterised by mutual suspicion between the UK and the Soviet Union. Three weeks of difficult negotiations followed before the two countries reached an agreement to cooperate against Germany. The UK consulted with the US, Canada, Australia and South Africa before concluding the agreement. The military alliance was to be valid until the end of the war against Germany.

The agreement was signed on 12 July 1941 by Sir Stafford Cripps, British Ambassador to the Soviet Union (Note: As "His Majesty's Ambassador Extraordinary and Plenipotentiary in the Union of Soviet Socialistic Republics.") and Vyacheslav Molotov, the Soviet People's Commissar of Foreign Affairs, (Note: as "The Deputy President of the Council of People's Commissars and People's Commissar for Foreign Affairs of the Union of Soviet Socialistic Republics") and it did not require ratification.

== Text ==
The agreement contained two clauses:

(1) The two Governments mutually undertake to render each other assistance and support of all kinds in the present war against Hitlerite Germany.

(2) They further undertake that during this war they will neither negotiate nor conclude an armistice or treaty of peace except by mutual agreement.

== Effect ==
With the signing of the agreement, the UK and Soviet Union formally became allies against Germany. Winston Churchill stated, "It is of course an alliance and the Russian people are now our allies."

The Arctic convoys from Britain to the Soviet Union began the following month as did the joint Anglo-Soviet invasion of Iran which opened up a supply route to the USSR. In Iran, Rezā Shāh was removed from power and the new Shah, Crown Prince Mohammad Reza Pahlavi, signed a Tripartite Treaty Alliance with Britain and the Soviet Union in January 1942 to aid the allied war effort in a non-military way.

The two principles of the agreement, a commitment to mutual assistance and renunciation of a separate peace, mirrored the first two resolutions of the Declaration of St James's Palace with other Allies, which formed the basis of the Declaration by United Nations signed in January 1942.

The agreement was broadened by the Anglo-Soviet Treaty of 1942 to include a political alliance lasting 20 years.

== Reactions ==
According to Lynn Davis, the United States perceived the agreement to mean that the Soviet Union intended to support the postwar re-establishment of independence of Poland, Czechoslovakia and Yugoslavia.

== See also ==
- Allies of World War II
- Anglo-Soviet relations
- Anglo-Soviet Trade Agreement (1921)
- Atlantic Charter
- Diplomatic history of World War II
