= New Atlantic Charter =

2021 agreement between US and UK

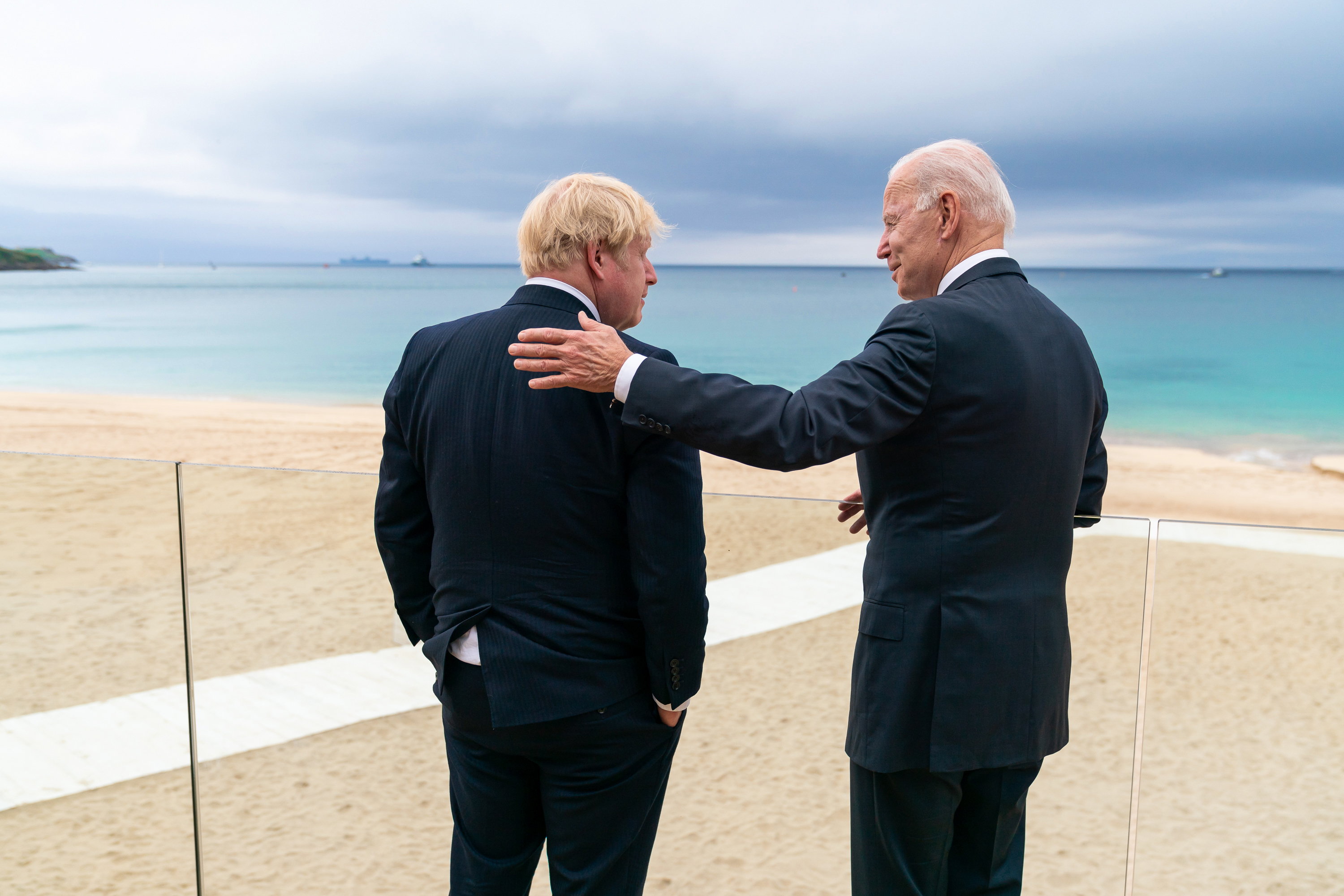
UK prime minister Boris Johnson (left) meets U.S. president Joe Biden (right) at the G7 Summit, June 2021.

The New Atlantic Charter is a bilateral agreement that was signed by Prime Minister Boris Johnson of the United Kingdom and President Joe Biden of the United States on 10 June 2021. The agreement was signed at the first face-to-face meeting between Johnson and Biden at the 2021 G7 Summit in Cornwall, England.

The agreement is a new version of the Atlantic Charter, declared by British prime minister Winston Churchill and American president Franklin D. Roosevelt in 1941. The meeting at which the agreement was declared was used to redefine the Western alliance.

== Background ==
The original Atlantic Charter is an agreement that was issued by Winston Churchill and Franklin D. Roosevelt in August 1941. It was a declaration of a Western commitment to democracy and territorial integrity, months before the US entered World War II. The original charter affirmed that the US and UK sought no territorial gains, that all people had a right to self-determination, territorial adjustments must be in accord with the peoples concerned, trade barriers should be lowered, and there should be a disarmament after the war.

The new agreement was signed at the 2021 G7 summit in Cornwall at the first face-to-face meeting between Joe Biden and Boris Johnson since Joe Biden took office. Joe Biden "affirmed the Special Relationship between our people and renewed our commitment to defending the enduring democratic values that both our nations share". The New Atlantic Charter also reaffirmed "the commitments and aspirations set out eighty years ago," while also addressing the "new challenges" of the 21st century.

== Objectives ==
The charter set out eight aims:

- To defend the principles and institutions of democracy and open societies
- To strengthen and adapt the institutions, laws and norms that sustain international co-operation
- To remain united behind principles of sovereignty, territorial integrity and peaceful resolution of disputes
- To harness and protect the countries' innovative edge in science and technology
- To affirm the shared responsibility to maintain collective security and international stability, including against cyber threats; and to declare the countries' nuclear deterrents to the defence of NATO
- To continue building an inclusive, fair, climate-friendly, sustainable, rules-based economy
- To prioritise climate change in all international action
- To commit to continuing to collaborate to strengthen health systems and advance health protections

== See also ==
- AUKUS
