= Anglo-Soviet Trade Agreement =

1921 British-Russian economic policy agreement

The Anglo-Soviet Trade Agreement was an agreement signed on 16 March 1921 to facilitate trade between the United Kingdom and the Russian Socialist Federative Soviet Republic. It was signed by Robert Horne, Chancellor of the Exchequer and Leonid Krasin, Commissar of Foreign Trade. Lenin's New Economic Policy downplayed socialism and emphasized business dealings with capitalist countries in an effort to restart the sluggish Russian economy. Britain was the first country to accept Lenin's offer of a trade agreement. It ended the British blockade, and Russian ports now were open to British ships. Both sides agreed to refrain from hostile propaganda. It amounted to de facto diplomatic recognition and opened a period of extensive trade.

== Background ==
David Lloyd George first raised the proposal to drop the blockade on Russia, following the October Revolution at a meeting of the Allied Supreme Council, held on 14 January 1920, four days after the Treaty of Versailles had been ratified. Originally trade was to be restricted to being with the "Russian people", through Centrosoyuz, the All-Russian Union of Consumer Co-operative Societies. However, by the end of May 1920, Leonid Krasin had arrived in London and the terms of the agreement had shifted. Also, although originally an Allied proposal, the French declined Lord Curzon's invitation to participate, and the Italians sent a chargé d'affaires who only participated in one session.

Meanwhile, the Bolsheviks, upon hearing of the Supreme Council's intention of lifting of the blockade and developing trade with the Co-operatives, responded by taking Centrosoyuz over. Initially the Bolsheviks had been hesitant to enter diplomacy with Western countries out of an ideological belief that they would soon be overturned in a world revolution against capitalism. However, by 1920 this belief was beginning to wane. Lenin wrote the executive decree promulgated by the Council of People's Commissars on 27 January which put this into effect. Krasin and his fellow delegates were nominally co-opted on to the board of Centrosoyuz, maintaining the fiction that negotiations were being carried out with the Co-operatives Union.

== First phase of negotiations: from 31 May to 7 July 1920 ==
Krasin was accompanied by Viktor Nogin to London to engage in the negotiations. The British Cabinet discussed the proposed agreement at 10 Downing Street on 28 May 1920. Lord Curzon had previously briefed the meeting:

'We know from a great variety of sources that the Russian Government is threatened with complete economic disaster, and that it is ready to pay almost any price for the assistance which we - more than anyone else - are in a position to give. We can hardly contemplate coming to its rescue without exacting our price for it, and it seems to me that price can far better be paid in a cessation of Bolshevik hostility in parts of the world important to us, than the ostensible exchange of commodities, the existence of which on any considerable scale in Russia there is grave reason to doubt.'

There were four meetings held on 31 May, 7 June, 16 June, and 29 June. The first two were more formal, but the third meeting consisted only of Lloyd George, Krasin, Sir Robert Horne, Philip Kerr and Fridtjof Nansen. However, the last meeting was to prove crucial. Both Krasin and Lloyd George agreed that there were two principal issues:

- Hostile propaganda and subversion
- pre-1917 debts to British creditors

Faced with an impending meeting with Britain's allies, Lloyd George drew up a four-point plan:

- An armistice and end to hostile propaganda
- The exchange of prisoners
- Mutual recognition of outstanding debts for goods and services
- Exchange of trade missions

Krasin was given 7 days in which to reply and provided passage on board HMS Vimiera to Tallinn (Reval). Georgy Chicherin responded on 7 July agreeing to these terms in principle. However, negotiations were delayed by the Polish–Soviet War and by the hesitance of many Conservative Cabinet members, including Lord Curzon and Winston Churchill, to negotiate with Soviet Russia.

== Second phase of negotiations: from 8 July to 11 September 1920 ==
Lev Kamenev was appointed the head of the new negotiating team at Chicherin's insistence over Lenin's objections.

== Third phase of negotiations: from 12 September 1920 to 16 March 1921 ==
Negotiations were long and protracted. Lenin remarked at the 8th All Russian Congress of Soviets on 21 December 1920:

The treaty, the trade agreement with Britain is not signed yet. At this very moment Krasin is conducting urgent talks on it in London. The British government has handed us its draft, we have given our counterdraft, but it is still obvious that the British government is dragging its feet over the agreement because the reactionary war party is still hard at work there; it has had the upper hand so far and is hindering the conclusion of a trade agreement. It is in our direct interest, and it is our direct duty to give all our support to whatever can help to fortify those parties and groupings who are striving for the signature of this treaty with us.

Ivan Maisky was to underline the importance of the agreement thus:

This diplomatic document, though modest in scope, is of truly historic significance. The Anglo-Soviet Trade Agreement was not an ordinary trade treaty with the mere object of regulating commercial operations between two countries; it was an agreement of politico-commercial character: it gave the RSFSR de facto recognition by the most powerful capitalist power in Europe, a power which in those days still successfully contended with the USA for the role of the foremost capitalist country in the world.

== See also ==
- Anglo-Soviet Agreement of 1941
- Anglo-Soviet relations
- Anglo-Soviet Treaty of 1942
- Triple Entente
- Russo-British Chamber of Commerce
