= Separate peace =

Type of peace agreement

A separate peace is an agreement by one nation to cease military hostilities with another, even though allies of the country remain at war with the latter country. For example, at the start of the First World War, Russia was a member of the Triple Entente. After the February Revolution and the October Revolution, Russia defaulted on its commitments to the Triple Entente by signing a separate peace with Germany and its allies in 1917. This armistice was followed on March 3, 1918, by the formal signing of the Treaty of Brest-Litovsk.

During the Second World War, after 1941, when the Soviets were allied with the British and the Americans, to the end of the war in 1945, both sides suspected the other of seeking separate peace with Germany, though this did not occur.

An earlier important example is the Franco-Dutch War of 1672, which France and England entered together, but from which the English withdrew unilaterally by a separate peace with the Dutch, the Treaty of Westminster (1674).

== Legal obligations not to conclude separate peace ==
It is customary, in cases of war waged by several allies, to reach a peace accord or declaration with the agreement of all parties to the alliance, instead of creating a separate peace with opposing forces. An example of such an undertaking was included in the alliance treaty concluded between the Papal States, Burgundy, and Venice, concluded in Rome in 1463. The parties undertook to launch a crusade against the Turks and to refrain from making peace with the Sultan without the consent of all three parties. Such was the case during the First and Second World Wars.

A declaration to that effect was issued on September 4, 1914, by the British, French, and Russian governments, which briefly stated

The British, French, and Russian Governments mutually engage not to conclude peace separately during the present war. The three Governments agree that when terms of peace come to be discussed, no one of the allies will demand conditions of peace without the previous agreement of each of the other allies.

The Japanese government acceded to this declaration on October 19, 1915.

On November 30, 1915, the same four governments, now joined by the Italian government, issued a similar joint declaration regarding avoiding separate peace.

The obligation to refrain from separate peace was also made during the Second World War in both camps. The Tripartite Pact from September 27, 1940 between the German, Italian, and Japanese governments committed the three to prosecute the war together. On the Allied camp, that obligation was contained in the United Nations Declaration of January 1, 1942.

A similar obligation arose within the Arab League, in the context of the Arab-Israeli conflict, not to reach any separate peace treaty with the Israeli government, in order to assure that a collective arrangement would take into consideration the interests of all Arab states plus the Palestinians (see Khartoum Resolution). The Egyptian government under Anwar Sadat acted in contrast to that rule when it decided to conclude a separate peace treaty in 1979, and was followed by Jordan with the Israel–Jordan peace treaty in 1994. Subsequent peace treaties have been made with the United Arab Emirates, Bahrain, Morocco, and Sudan through the Abraham Accords in 2020.
