= Advanced Base Force =

- Active: 1913–1921
- Country: United States
- Branch: United States Marine Corps
- Type: Advanced base operations
- Part of: U.S. Navy Department

The United States Marine Corps's Advanced Base Force (Advance Base Force in some references) was a coastal and naval base defense force that was designed to set up mobile and fixed bases in the event of major landing operations within, and beyond, the territorial United States. Established in the beginning of the 20th century, the Advanced Base Force was the United States' first combined task force built on the concept of the Marine Corps' traditional role in expeditionary warfare. The slow development of the advanced base force played a significant role in the controversy over the removal of the ships' guards (Marines on Navy ships) in 1908–1909.

Relying on the full projection capabilities of their naval counterparts, the Advanced Base Force enabled the United States Navy to meet all the demands for its use of naval services within its own sphere of maritime operations. It also allowed operational independence, without the cooperation of the United States Army for troops and military supplies, as such a force might not be available. The General Board had concluded that one or two regiments of the Advanced Base Force were more than adequate to defend naval bases against cruiser raids, and were also able to land with thirty emplaced naval guns, high-angle field artillery, machine guns, infantry, and water and land minefields. The Advanced Base Force is the ancestor of today's Fleet Marine Force.

== Background ==
Before the creation of the Advanced Base Force, the victory over Spain in the Spanish–American War had greatly influenced the expansion of the United States. By the time the Treaty of Paris was ratified in 1898 the United States had annexed the Philippines in the western Pacific to influence foreign relations in China and Korea; primarily through the presence of the Asiatic Squadron. United States territories under the administration of President William McKinley included Guam and the Hawaiian Islands, also extending to the south Pacific insular areas of Samoa. Also, Congress approved the Foraker Act for the annexation of Puerto Rico for the defense and protection of the newly independent Cuba from any possible foreign attack. The government also negotiated with Nicaragua and Colombia for the right to build an isthmian canal, eventually through Panama.

Due to the new, vast expansion of territory, the Navy began to assume strategic duties unimagined before 1898. In 1900, the "General Board of the Navy" was established to foresee and make recommendations on naval policy, assuming the tasks of the nation's naval expeditionary and strategic challenges.

The General Board developed some potential war plans for possible events that might occur if attacks were to be made against the continental east coast, the Antilles of the Caribbean, or the Panama Canal. The most dangerous likely foe that the United States Navy faced was the British Royal Navy, which had been included in War Plan Red; however, relations had improved and both already committed to a growing rapprochement. The board instead agreed that the most likely foe would be Germany's Imperial Navy, a burgeoning force of warships that were at the disposal of Emperor Wilhelm II. In response to possible German naval invasion of the Caribbean or attacks on the east coast, the United States devised War Plan Black. This plan also dealt with Germany having purchased Spain's remaining Central Pacific island colonies, with the Mariana Islands and the Caroline Islands, and its establishment of a naval base in China in 1900. Also, after the Russo-Japanese War, victorious Imperial Japan had serious plans of expanding its influence south and east in the Pacific. The United States Navy solely relied on the Pacific islands as refueling stations for the coal-powered navy ships; the lifeline to the naval bases in the Philippines and Guam. If such an attack was initiated by the Japanese, a system of Pacific naval bases needed to be built in order to put War Plan Orange (a response to a Japanese attack on the Philippines) into effect.

To sum it up, the Navy's war planning after 1900 assumed that maritime attacks on the United States and its interests were possible in both the Pacific and the Caribbean. Given the thousands of miles the fleet would have to steam to provide security to the outermost bases of Guam, the Philippines, etc., the General Board was convinced that it would require hastily developed advanced bases, and it could not depend on the small and overextended United States Army to defend the bases in short order.

== Definitive history ==
In late 1901 a four-company battalion was formed at Annapolis and Newport by then-Commandant of the Marine Corps Major General Charles Heywood for expeditionary and advanced base training. General Heywood had been pressured by both the General Board and Secretary of the Navy, John D. Long, to create such a force that was to be placed on naval transport and well-drilled and equipped for duties given at short notice in any of the territories annexed by the United States, without relying on the slower and more demanding process of deploying the Army.

=== Organization ===
The Advanced Base Force was "officially" created on 23 December 1913 by Commandant William P. Biddle and was designated as the 1st Advanced Base Brigade, the lineal forebear of the 1st Marine Division. Briefly, two regiments were designated as the Fixed Defense Regiment and the Mobile Defense Regiment. They both are forebears of Marine regiments that exist today; the 1st Regiment of the Advanced Base Force subsequently became the 2nd Marine Regiment, whereas the 2nd Regiment became the 1st Marine Regiment.

An aviation detachment had been established a few years before in 1911, under command of the United States' sixth naval aviator, Lieutenant Bernard L. Smith. This detachment is not to be confused with the 1917 "permanent" Aviation Company, which was under command of the United States' fifth naval (and the Marine Corps' first) aviator, Marine officer Alfred A. Cunningham.

==== Fixed Defense Regiment ====
On 19 June 1913, the Fixed Defense Regiment, under command of Lieutenant Colonel Charles G. Long, was formed at the Philadelphia Navy Yard. The Fixed Defense Regiment was the forerunner of the Marine Defense Battalions that were responsible for coastal defense of various naval bases throughout the Pacific during World War II.

On 3 January 1914, the Fixed Defense Regiment at Culebra Island, Puerto Rico, along with the Mobile Defense Force, formed the Advanced Base Force Brigade, under the command of Colonel George Barnett, who had commanded the Marine Barracks at the Philadelphia Navy Yard and the Advanced Base School. By 18 February 1914, it was redesignated as the 1st Regiment, Advanced Base Brigade. For the next two months, the regiment operated on board ship off New Orleans and Algiers, Louisiana.

In 1915, the regiment consisted of:

- Headquarters company
- C Company, the minelaying company trained to handle harbor defense mines.
- E Company, the signal company trained in radio, telephone, telegraph, buzzers, and visual signalling.
- F and I Companies were responsible for the fixed batteries to be mounted in harbor defense.
- H Company which was trained both as a combat engineer company and as a heavy automatic weapons company
- a field artillery battery which manned 3-inch (76 mm) field pieces

The Aviation Company was established by Alfred A. Cunningham at the Philadelphia Navy Yard on 26 February 1917. The company's strength consisted of ten officers and forty men in billets as aviators and as staff personnel. The Advanced Base Force's aviation company became the first permanent aviation element in the Marine Corps.

==== Mobile Defense Regiment ====
Commandant Biddle assembled the Mobile Defense Regiment at the Pensacola Navy Yard from the expeditionary battalions that had been stationed abroad in Mexican territorial waters; Commandant Biddle assigned Lieutenant Colonel John A. Lejeune as the commanding officer. The regiment was composed of four rifle companies, a machine gun company, and a field gun battery. These were divided into mobile infantry/artillery battalion landing forces, the predecessors to the Marine Regimental (RLT) and Battalion Landing Teams (BLT) that performed numerous landing operations from the Pacific Theater of World War II, to the Korean War, Vietnam War, and later years.

Between 2–3 January 1914, the Mobile Defense Regiment sailed aboard USS Prairie and rendezvoused with the Fixed Base Regiment at Culebra Island, Puerto Rico, forming the Advanced Base Force Brigade, the first operational unit of this size and type.

=== Institution ===
==== 1900–1905 ====
A brilliant intelligence officer, U.S. Marine Captain Dion Williams, who was serving in the Office of Naval Intelligence, wrote an extensive thesis in 1902 stressing that U.S. safety rested on the U.S. Navy's ability to coal its vessels in time of war. He endorsed that any war the United States will enter in the future should first be conceived as a "naval war". Williams, however, differentiated between fixed and mobile defense forces. He announced that the fixed defense force should be a permanent regiment of 1,312 Marines to man artillery and establish necessary minefields and barriers; the mobile defense force should be a regiment of two infantry battalions and one field artillery battery, which could be formed quickly from Marine naval base detachments. He urged stockpiling equipment and weapons, assigning transport permanently to the force, and holding annual maneuvers.

In the summer of 1902, Secretary of the Navy William H. Moody ordered an advanced base force battalion to be prepared for an upcoming fleet exercises that winter in the Caribbean Islands. This exercise proved to the Marine Corps the necessity of naval gun emplacement and setting up base defenses. Also, the expeditionary battalion that was stationed in Cavite, Philippines had already been exercising in Subic Bay and had employed eight heavy guns at the bay's entrance. Even though the battalion in the Philippines was not formally part of the advanced base force concept, it was marking a new ideal for the Marine Corps.

The first advanced base exercises had taken place on Culebra, Puerto Rico in 1903, proving to the General Board how well the Marines could perform the ideals and concepts that were conceived. It opened many new perspectives for the future of the Marines; and it sparked a harsh chapter of interservice rivalry. The captain of USS Panther demanded that the Marines perform their duties as a ship's guard, including ship security and acting as a provost marshal to provide deterrence against mutiny. This act forcibly neglected the advanced base force battalion's training schedule and defense planning. Even ashore the naval officers had little understanding of the problems of moving heavy weaponry and equipment across broken terrain, and the advanced base force languished by 1903 due to the large number of east coast Marines deployed to Panama and Cuba. Only then were the Marines in the Philippines included in the General Board's advanced base force concept.

==== 1905–1910 ====
In an exercise in 1907 at Subic Bay, a battalion commanded by Major Eli K. Cole emplaced forty-four heavy guns in a ten-week period due to the Eight-eight fleet war scare with Japan in 1907, which convinced the Navy Department that it should organize the matériel for an advanced base force to be available in the Philippines, along with a well-prepared and trained force in Philadelphia, Pennsylvania. The Marine Corps at the time recorded a strength increase of two thousand men since 1903, and the General Board considered it a favorable quota to proceed in organizing a "permanent" advanced base force; thus making further cooperation with the Army unnecessary.

The General Board in 1909 reviewed the scant progress since 1900 and concluded that neither the Navy Department nor the Marine Corps had done much to make the advanced base force a reality. Commandant George F. Elliott and his staff were criticized by the navy officers for not implementing former commandant Charles Heywood's agreements. Admiral George Dewey expressed disappointment and Navy Commander William F. Fullam, a known opponent to the Marine Corps, took it upon himself to denounce Elliott for failure to use additional Marines for expeditionary duty, which was the only hope for naval reformers in creating the advanced base force.

Several factors helped renew interest in the advanced base force. The most significant factor was the appointment in 1909 of a new Secretary of the Navy, George von L. Meyer, who created the Naval Aide system. Meyer's aides were four line officers with direct responsibilities for policy in four functional areas: operations, inspections, personnel, and matériel. Secretary Meyer appointed Bradley A. Fiske as Aide for Operations and William Fullam as Aide for Inspections, the Marine Corps' own rival and nemesis, to staff these posts. The aides and the General Board improved policy matters and were very influential on behalf of war preparedness and establishing a balanced naval fleet. The Aide for Operations subsequently became the Chief of Naval Operations in 1915. Another factor was an increased number of men available for advanced base training due to the conflicts of the Nicaraguan Expedition of 1912 and the Veracruz landing in 1914.

Importantly, Colonel William P. Biddle replaced General Elliott as the commandant of the Marine Corps, who in turn approved three important reforms that strengthened the Corps' ability to respond to advanced base missions; one of which was the establishment of an assistant to the commandant. The Assistant Commandant of the Marine Corps was responsible for the military training and preparedness of the Marines. Lieutenant Colonel Eli K. Cole was the first to hold this office. Secondly, the creation of permanent expeditionary companies at each Marine Barracks. And thirdly, the institution of mandatory three months' recruit training for all Marine recruits. In addition, Biddle continued Elliott's policy of assigning a few Marine officers to Navy and Army advanced officer schools for further training in large unit maneuvers, artillery, communications, and contingency planning.

==== 1910–1915 ====
In March 1910 Assistant Secretary of the Navy Beekman Winthrop sent Commandant Biddle a direct order to take custody of the advanced base materiel and take the necessary steps to instruct officers and enlisted men in the use of this materiel. Assessing the related experiences through 1911, Marine Major Henry C. Davis argued that the advanced base force was the Corps' "true" mission and it should be embraced as such. By next summer, the Advanced Base School was transferred to the Philadelphia Navy Yard.

Two new revolutions in the Marine Corps also helped established the legitimacy of the Advanced Base Force; the first was the formation of the Marine Corps Association (MCA) and the Marine Corps Gazette, founded by John A. Lejeune in 1911, and second, the new avenues for innovation of Marine and Naval Aviation. The Marine Corps' first aviator, 1st Lieutenant Alfred A. Cunningham, saw a role for aircraft in the advanced base force. Joined at Annapolis by Lieutenant Bernard L. Smith, the Marine Corps' second aviator, both learned to fly planes from civilian instructors, and both later reported to the Advanced Base Force in 1913, to create an aviation section within the force.

In June 1913 the Advanced Base Force brigade was formed, composed of two permanently organized regiments, the Fixed Defense Regiment and the Mobile Defense Regiment. Each regiment was tailored to its specific part in the advanced base force concept. At the same time, numerical designations for companies were adopted to alleviate the problem of having more than one company A, for example, in any units of an expeditionary force. On 23 December 1913, the brigade was redesignated as the 1st Advance Force Brigade, and again on 1 April 1914, as the 1st Brigade. The 1st Brigade was deactivated on 15 August 1934, after participating in the Occupation of Haiti from August 1915 until August 1934.

Despite the efforts in the creation of the Advanced Base School, too much energy had been spent on academic arguments over the advanced base concept; it was time to fully test the concept in fleet maneuvers. By December 1913, the Marine Corps had done more to make the advanced base force a reality in one year than it had in the last twelve years.

By 1914, the advanced base force included reconnaissance seaplanes. The fortunes of Marine aviation from its infancy were associated with advanced base operations.

In July 1914, a Marine colonel, Joseph Pendleton, encamped his Marines at the fairgrounds in Balboa Park in San Diego, CA. On 19 December 1914, he established a Marine Barracks in San Diego to house the advanced base/expeditionary forces. However, the status of a permanent base was debated in the federal government.

In January 1915, about the time the Panama–California Exposition opened at Balboa Park in San Diego, California, the Marine Corps received funding to develop its new bases on the west coast in San Diego, with a similar training base at Quantico, Virginia on the east coast. Also, the funding provided the necessary materiel to establish an aviation company of ten officers and forty men, which grew proportionally larger shortly thereafter, due to a reorganization allowing increased personnel strength ordered through the General Board and the Navy Department.

After George Barnett became commandant, Headquarters Marine Corps transferred the Advanced Base School [again] to Newport, Rhode Island, adding it to the Naval War College curriculum. This move became the fulcrum of the advanced base force's successful future, although it was not apparent at the time. The earliest scholars and missionaries of this concept at the Naval War College were Dion Williams, Eli K. Cole, John H. Russell, and Robert H. Dunlap, all of whom pioneered the advanced base force concept since the very beginning.

A Marine intelligence officer, Lieutenant Colonel Earl H. Ellis, a fellow patron of the Navy War College in 1912–1913, was influenced by the advanced base operations concept. In his tenure as a student, and later as an instructor, he created a curriculum for and instrumented war plans and procedures that became vital to the success of the United States' Pacific island-hopping campaign that would occur 25 years later in World War II. He also plotted accurate charts, based on his ability in hydrographic surveying and topography; pointing out that seizing a well-defended island rested upon the integral advanced base force, and that the Marine Corps' future fully relied on the advanced base force, for both defense and assault. Ellis' work impressed John A. Lejeune, who soon became Ellis' patron as well as a coadvocate of the advanced base force concept.

Ellis participated in drafting war plans against Japan that later became the vital major thesis on which the island-hopping campaign in the Pacific Theater during World War II was based. Ellis covertly spied on the Japanese, disguised as a civilian seeking business in Micronesia and surrounding islands.

Also in 1915, Colonel Eli K. Cole continued his own advocacy the moment he was appointed as the commandant of the Advanced Base School and the commander of the 1st Regiment (Fixed Defense), (ending his tenure as the first Assistant Commandant of the Marine Corps, 1911—1915), by emphasizing the procurement of new weapons and equipment, plus the necessary technical training.

Next to serve as the assistant to Commandant George Barnett was Colonel John A. Lejeune. During his tenure of 1915–1917, he spoke for the commandant, stressing the missions of the Advanced Base Force. He argued that the Marine Corps' organization needed reconstructing, urging that the Marine Corps as a whole, not just particular regiments, be assigned to advanced base duty; this reorganization should be the Marine Corps' primary function in the United States' naval services. Col. Lejeune also supported the article printed in the Marine Corps Gazette by John H. Russell, who drafted one of the earliest advanced base force studies.

The expeditionary duties in the Caribbean were among the main events that conflicted with the formation of a legitimate advanced base force that could be retained permanently to serve abroad at navy bases. In August 1914 World War I broke out in Europe, pitting the German, Austrian, and Turkish armies against the coalition of Great Britain, France, and Russia. After the American entry into World War I in April 1917, two Marine regiments, the 5th and 6th Marines with other units, were raised and trained to serve in France as half of the Army's 2nd Division. The Marines' battles of World War I in 1917–1919 would prove and test the Marine Corps' new creed of maritime combat. From 1900 through 1916, much had changed to evolve the old principle of "ship-only" duty as security guards, and the occasional landing force participants. Insomuch, the "advanced base force concept" had emplaced itself as the father of modern amphibious warfare, another concept that would revolutionize the Marine Corps in the years to follow.

=== Operation ===
==== Veracruz, 1914 ====
The Marine Corps's Advanced Base Force, and its Navy cooperatives, participated in the United States's next intervention when the late-President of Mexico Francisco Madero was executed by Victoriano Huerta's Porfirista military conspirators on 22 February 1913. 500 Marines of the 2nd Advanced Base Regiment were among the first to land at Veracruz, Mexico in April 1914 after the Tampico Affair. The aviation company with the Advanced Base Force, however, missed its first chance at expeditionary duty during this operation because it had not yet discovered a way to get its two aircraft, both seaplanes, to the objective area in flying condition.

== Training ==
=== Advanced Base School ===
The Advanced Base School was established at New London, Connecticut by the Headquarters Marine Corps (HQMC) in April 1910. The General Board asked the Secretary of the Navy, George Meyer, to order the newly appointed Commandant of the Marine Corps, Colonel William P. Biddle, to assume responsibilities for the advanced base equipment assembled at Philadelphia and Subic Bay, Philippines. More or less, the commandant was in charge of ensuring that all the officers and enlisted were adequately trained in the formal study of the advanced base force. The Marines found the training more demanding than any they had encountered before. Marines in the past were restricted only to sea duty; the advanced base concept opened new revolutionary methods never thought of before in United States naval history. Working by day and studying by night, the regiment's officers trained their men to assemble and aim a melange of 3-inch and 5-inch (130 mm) naval guns, army field artillery, land mines, searchlights, and automatic weapons.

By March 1910, Assistant Secretary of the Navy Beekman Winthrop, acting for the secretary, sent the order to the commandant. The school assembled a handful of officers and men to begin the formal study of advanced base defenses. The next summer, the school was moved to the Philadelphia Navy Yard in order to work more closely with the actual equipment that was to be used by the Advanced Base Force. However, training had little continuity, mostly due to various expeditionary duties that took place in the Caribbean.

"You will prepare for the care and custody of advanced base materiel and take necessary steps to instruct the officers and men under your command in the use of this materiel." — Assistant Sec. of the Navy Beekman Winthrop to Commandant William Biddle, March 1910.

=== Fleet exercises ===
The Advanced Base Force Brigade, commanded by Colonel George Barnett, landed on Culebra Island off Puerto Rico on 3 January 1914, with the landing forces of the Atlantic Fleet, and spent a week preparing coastal defenses for their upcoming "first" advanced base exercise.

The Culebra exercises became the first of many fleet landing exercises to come over the years, consisting of the occupation and defense of the island by the advanced base force brigade. The brigade emplaced batteries of 3-inch (76 mm) field guns on each side of the entrance to Culebra's harbor and laid controlled mines offshore; the aggressor forces were simulated by a detached Marine battalion landing force with the Atlantic Fleet. The signal company, in addition to laying mines, provided communications (telegraph and telephone) for the brigade, established radio stations, and operated day and night visual stations. The engineers assisted the fixed gun companies in the preparation of gun emplacements, built docks, and established machine gun positions on certain parts of the harbor shore line. The first artillery battery emplaced 4.7-inch (120 mm) guns in permanent positions, holding its 3-inch (76 mm) field pieces in reserve.

However, they found many discrepancies during the off-loading of equipment; mainly the landing craft, both experimental lighters and ships' boats, were almost to the point of being unsuitable. Once ashore, they discovered shortages of engineering tools and transportation, even with the use of the portable Decauville track system. Nonetheless, the Marines moved into position, manning the guns, their infantry entrenched. A counterattack force hidden in the hills as the "attacking" force conducted simulated raids by cruisers and large beach landing teams.

The chief umpire, then-Captain William S. Sims, and the Navy observers (mostly from the Naval War College) offered recommendations to the Marine artillery crews in different naval gunfire techniques. They thought that the Marines shouldn't engage the "enemy" warships in an artillery duel, risking exposure; they agreed instead that high-angle artillery and flat-trajectory naval gunfire would make the fixed defenses the absolute choice in engagements. CAPT Sims concluded that the Marines, making up the "mock" landing force of 1,200 sailors and Marines, could not breach the island's defenses. However, amidst the smoke and the barrage of blanks, and an array of searchlights scanning the beaches, the Advanced Base Force successfully defended Culebra. The Navy umpires officially agreed that the Marine Corps had finally refined the advanced base concepts and were able to organize the operational units required by the General Board's war plans.

== See also ==
- Harbor Defenses of Manila and Subic Bays
- Organization of the United States Marine Corps
