= United States amphibious operations =

United States amphibious operations for US Navy, US Army and US Marine Corps

The United States has a long history in amphibious warfare from the landings in the Bahamas during the American Revolutionary War, to some of the more massive examples of World War II in the European Theater of Operation on Normandy, in Africa and in Italy, and the constant island warfare of the Pacific Theater of Operations. Throughout much of its history, the United States prepared its troops in both the United States Marine Corps and the United States Army to fight land from sea into the center of battle.

== History ==
The United States' first role in amphibious warfare was inaugurated when the Continental Marines made their first amphibious landing on the beaches of the Bahamas during the Battle of Nassau on 3 March 1776. Even during the Civil War, the United States Navy's ships brought ashore soldiers, sailors, and Marines to capture coastal forts. General Robert E. Lee, the Confederate Army commander, declared:

"Wherever his [Union] fleet can be brought, no opposition to his landing can be made except within range of our fixed batteries. We have nothing to oppose his heavy guns, which sweep over the low banks of this country with irresistible force."

The victory over Spain in the Spanish–American War had greatly enabled the expansion of the United States. By the time the Treaty of Paris was ratified in 1898 the United States had annexed the Philippines in the western Pacific to influence foreign relations in China and Korea; primarily through the presence of the Asiatic Squadron. The administration of President William McKinley included Guam and the Hawaiian Islands to the south Pacific insular areas of Samoa. Also, Congress approved the Foraker Act in the annexation of Puerto Rico for the defense and protection of the newly independent Cuba from any possible foreign attack. The government also negotiated with Nicaragua and Colombia for the right to build an isthmian canal through Panama. Due to the new, vast expansion of territory, the Navy began to assume strategic duties unimagined before 1898.

In 1900, the "General Board of the Navy" was established to foresee and make recommendations on naval policy, assuming the tasks of the nation's naval expeditionary and strategic challenges.

Around this time, the General Board developed some potential war plans for possible events that may be measured if such attacks were to be aimed for the continental east coast, the Antilles of the Caribbean, or the Panama Canal. The most dangerous, likely foe that the United States Navy faced was the British Royal Navy, and had been implemented into War Plan Red, however, relations had improved and both already committed to a growing rapprochement. It instead agreed that the next likely foe would be the Germany's Imperial Navy, a burgeoning force of warships that were at the disposal of Emperor Wilhelm II. In response to possible German naval invasion of the Caribbean or attacks on the east coast, the United States devised War Plan Black. To also include Germany having purchased Spain's remaining central Pacific island colonies, and the Mariana Islands and the Caroline Islands, and its establishment of a naval base in China in 1900. And after the Russo-Japanese War, victorious Imperial Japan had serious plans of expanding its influence south and in the west Pacific. The United States Navy solely relied on the islands for refueling stations for the coal-powered navy ships; the lifeline to the naval bases in the Philippines and Guam. If such an attack was initiated by the Japanese, a system of Pacific naval bases were needed to be built, in order to put War Plan Orange into effect.

The sum of it all, the Navy's war planning after 1900 assumed that maritime attacks on the United States and its interests were possible in both the Pacific and the Caribbean, and given the thousands of miles the fleet would have to steam to provide security to the outermost bases of Guam, the Philippines, or of the similar. The General Board was convinced that it would require Marine expeditionary battalions that were capable in the hastily development of advanced bases, and it could not depend on the small and overextended United States Army to defend the bases in short, limited order.

=== Advanced Base Force ===
On the outset of the Spanish–American War, the Marines stormed the beaches of Cuba and captured Guantanamo Bay while the United States Army landed at Santiago. It was First Lieutenant Dion Williams, who raised the United States Flag at Manila Bay in 1898. Lt. Williams later epitomized the modernized doctrine of amphibious operations, focusing on seizure, preparation, and defense of advance bases, which also adopted the concept of amphibious reconnaissance.

The Marine Corps had begun to come to the realization of utilizing methods of seizing and defending objectives on shore. The Marine Corps Commandant, Brigadier General William P. Biddle sent orders to Earl H. Ellis, a Marine Officer, to the Advance Force Base, which in later years was re-established as the Fleet Marine Force in regards to his report and thesis he had written at the Navy War College concerning the setting up of advanced bases. The Advanced Base School was created in conjunction for the Advanced Base Force in New London, Connecticut in 1910.

=== Fleet Marine Force ===
By the 1930s, the Fleet Marine Force, which consists of the United States Navy and Marine Corps was developed. During this period, they began to modernize amphibious warfare that fabricated into the seminal Tentative Landing Operations Manual which was implemented in 1935. The doctrine set forth the organization, theory and practice of landing operations by establishing new troop organization and the development of amphibious landing crafts and tractors. Also, they emphasized the use of aerial and naval support in beach landings for the troops. The final element of the formula was the annual exercises called the 'Fleet Landing Exercises' (FLEX), which were conducted in the Caribbean, the California coast, and in the Hawaiian Islands, and which were similar to the exercises conducted by Lt. Col. Earl "Pete" Ellis on Culebra by the Advanced Base Force in January, 1914. This preparation proved invaluable in World War II, when the Marines not only spearheaded many of the attacks against Japanese-held islands in the Pacific theater of war, but also helped train the United States Army divisions that also participated in the island-hopping campaign.

=== Amphibious Corps ===
Throughout the Pacific campaign during World War II, the United States Army and Marine Corps trained the new graduated recruits in joint-amphibious operations. The Army created its own facility to accommodate the training necessary, establishing the Amphibious Training Center (ATC). The number of amphibious troops in the United States was inadequate and the Marine Corps was undermanned due to shortages in the Department of Navy's budget. In addition, Marine Corps was not capable of extensive sustainment operations that were necessary for longer campaigns. A notable product of the ATC was the deployment of Engineer Amphibian Brigades (later called Engineer Special Brigades).

The United States Navy controlled many joint units of the Army and the Marine Corps. The joint units consisted of two amphibious corps, the Amphibious Corps of the Pacific Fleet and of the Atlantic Fleet. These units represented the sum total of the amphibious forces of the United States, with the exception of small units of the Fleet Marine Force, which had been trained for amphibious raids. It was apparent that the United States Marine Corps did not have sufficient troops trained for the type of operation which was necessary to win the war.

The United States Navy controlled two joint Army-Marine "amphibious corps", in which the Army and Marine Corps's forces were attached under:

1. Amphibious Corps, Pacific Fleet (ACPF) – 3rd Infantry Division and the 2nd Marine Division
2. Amphibious Corps, Atlantic Fleet (ACAF) – 1st Infantry Division, 9th Infantry Division, and the 1st Marine Division

By 1943, primarily due to disagreements between the services, the Army closed its Amphibious Training Center. Subsequently, the Marine subordinate units of the Amphibious Corps, Pacific Fleet (ACPF) were re-allocated under the full command of the Marine Corps's V Amphibious Corps (VAC). In 1957, the Marine Corps assumed sole responsibility for amphibious operations.
