= War Plan Gray =

U.S. plan to invade the Azores, 1940–41

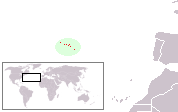
Location of the Portuguese Azores Islands

War Plan Gray was a plan for the United States to invade the Azores Islands in 1940–41 given the possibility of Germany seizing the islands. Gray is one of the many color-coded war plans created in the early 20th century. On 22 May 1941, President Franklin D. Roosevelt directed the U.S. Army and Navy to draft an official plan to occupy the Portuguese Azores. Approved by the Joint Board on 29 May, War Plan Gray called for a landing force of 28,000 troops, one half Marine and one half Army.

While motions were made to prepare for this invasion, a shifting of focus halted War Plan Gray and the Azores were never invaded. This was mainly credited to intelligence sources producing evidence that it was highly unlikely Nazi Germany would invade pro-fascist Francoist Spain and the scrupulously neutral Portuguese Estado Novo. With Germany invading the Soviet Union in Operation Barbarossa, this eased American fears concerning the Azores, resulting in the suspension of War Plan Gray and letting the US focus their time and forces elsewhere.

== Overview ==
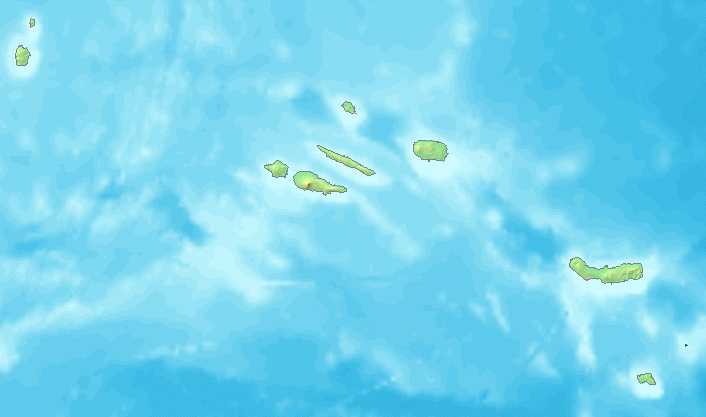
Portuguese Azores Islands

The Portuguese Azores lie among vital shipping lanes between the US and the Mediterranean Sea, Europe, and South America. Though the Azores were of little value to the Western Hemisphere's defense, this was countered by their immense value to Germany. If Germany was to build air and naval bases from these islands, they could put a further chokehold on British shipping.

This led U.S. Army and Navy planning officers in October 1940 to draft a plan for surprise invasion of the Azores. At the time, the plan was not feasible due to a lack of manpower and resources and it was incompatible with the US policy of staying out of the war. In May 1941, intelligence suggested the possibility of Germany seizing the Azores Islands. This led President Roosevelt to commission the Army and Navy to draft a new formal plan codenamed Gray. The plan was approved by the Joint Board on 29 May. It called for a force of 28,000 combat troops, half Marine and half Army. Gray's landing force would be commanded by Major General Holland M. Smith, USMC, under Rear Admiral Ernest J. King, the Expeditionary commander.

Six days before the Azores directive, US attention was turned towards Brazil, for fears of the Axis powers stepping into South America and the Western Hemisphere. This led to a change in urgency of the Azores operation. In June, intelligence sources produced credible evidence that Germany planned not to invade Spain and Portugal but the Soviet Union. This put an end to the fears of the Azores islands and War Plan Gray was suspended.

== See also ==
- War Plan Orange
- War Plan Red
- War Plan Black
- Rainbow war plans
- Operation Fork
