= U.S.–British Staff Conference (ABC–1) =

Military plan during World War II

The U.S.–British Staff Conference was a series of secret discussions between United States and British military staff members on American, British, and Canadian (ABC) military coordination in the event of U.S. entry into World War II. The conference took place in Washington, D.C. from January 29 to March 27, 1941 and concluded with a report entitled "ABC-1" which was tacitly approved by President Franklin D. Roosevelt two days later.

== Agreements reached at the conference ==
The United States agreed to secret staff discussions with the United Kingdom and Canada in 1940, but delayed them until after the 1940 United States presidential election due to Franklin D. Roosevelt's campaign pledges against direct U.S. involvement in World War II. After Roosevelt won a landslide victory against Wendell Willkie, it was agreed that they begin shortly after his third inauguration in January 1941.

The US-British Staff Conference Report of 1941 established the general military principles, resources, and deployment strategies for a joint Allied military strategy. The United States based its proposals off of Harold R. Stark's Plan Dog memorandum advocating a quick defeat of Nazi Germany, which laid the groundwork for the "Europe first" grand strategy. The British approach to the Nazi problem varied from the initial US plan. The British initially called for a Sun Tsu approach of attacking the flanks and periphery of the Nazi interests (North Africa, Middle East, etc.). By contrast, the US, following a Jomini-based approach sought a sledge-hammer, mass on mass battle with the Wehrmacht. The plan assumed that if the U.S. went to war with Nazi Germany, it would likely go to war with both Fascist Italy and Imperial Japan as well. The general principles of agreement stated that:

- America's territorial interest was in the Western Hemisphere;
- The security of the British Commonwealth must be maintained in all circumstances, including the retention of a Far East position;
- Security of sea communications between Allied Powers was essential.

Offensive policies included:

- The "early elimination" of Fascist Italy as an Axis partner;
- Support of neutral powers and underground resistance groups in resisting the Axis;
- Sustained air offensives to destroy Axis military power;
- Build-up of forces for the eventual offensive against Germany and the capture of positions from which to launch that offensive;
- The Atlantic and European areas were the "decisive theater" and as such would be the primary focus of US military efforts, although the "great importance" of the Middle East and Africa was noted.

Finally, if Japan entered the war, military strategy in the Far East would be defensive. Although the ABC-1 agreement was not a military alliance, it nevertheless signified that the United States was preparing to enter the war on the side of the Allied powers, that the United States would make every effort to maintain the security of the British Commonwealth, and that the United States military was modifying existing war plans (e.g., the RAINBOW plans) to incorporate military integration and cooperation with other nations.

== See also ==
- Diplomatic history of World War II
- List of Allied World War II conferences
