= War Plan White =

US War Plan against a domestic uprising in the United States

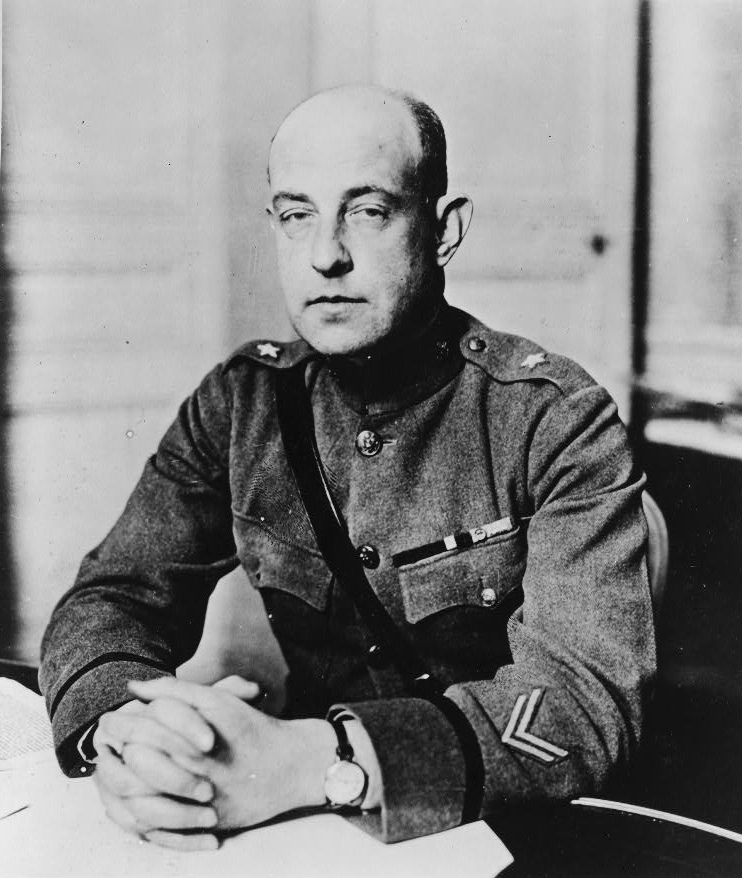
Brigadier General Churchill. pictured here circa 1912, was likely the original proponent for the creation of War Plan White

War Plan White (also known as Emergency Plan White) was a United States color-coded war plan originally created in 1919 to deal with a domestic uprising in the US. Originally drafted by the War Plans Division of the War Department General Staff (WDGS) it later evolved to become Operation Garden Plot, the general US military plan for civil disturbances and protests. Parts of War Plan White were used to deal with the Bonus Expeditionary Force in 1932. Communist insurgents were considered the most likely threat to call for the use of the plan by the original authors.

== Historical context ==
While freedom of assembly and the right to petition are protected by the First Amendment to the United States Constitution, the federal government of the United States has had a history of using the military to violently quash rebellions and other forms of civil unrest. Examples of the federal military being used in this capacity include its role in putting down the Whiskey Rebellion, Fries' Rebellion, the Dorr Rebellion, and John Brown's raid on Harpers Ferry. In the late 19th century, federal troops were increasingly used to quell labor disputes. Between 1885 and 1895, federal forces were mobilized 328 times; 118 of these instances involved labor disputes. Lack of instruction at the federal level in several labor disputes left states and local governments to effectively handle these issues on their own.

In the late 19th century and throughout most of the 20th century, red scares and the revolutionary success of the Bolsheviks in the former Russian Empire heightened both public and government fears of a violent communist uprising occurring within the United States. The Espionage Act of 1917 and the Sedition Act of 1918 were aimed at containing and prosecuting American communism in the midst of the American entry into World War I. In several notable cases (especially Gitlow v. New York), the Supreme Court of the United States upheld the government's right to criminalize speech advocating for a violent overthrow of the United States government.

== Development ==
Alarmed by information gathered by the Military Intelligence Division (MID) that alleged an imminent domestic communist uprising, Brig. Gen. Marlborough Churchill sent a memorandum to Director of the War Plans Division, Maj. Gen. William G. Haan, in October 1919 warning of the potential for rebellion. War Plan White began being drafted in earnest in the winter of 1919-20 with the help of intelligence reports from the MID, which were oftentimes drawn up based on information collected from the surveillance of citizens and resident aliens suspected of having communist sympathies.

On 24 May 1920, Secretary of War Baker authorized expansion of War Plan White to comprehensively deal with domestic insurrections, regardless of the political ideology of the would-be insurrectionists. Responsibility for the creation of the plan was divided between the War Department and the 9 corps areas that made up the military. Overseas commands in U.S. territories like Hawaii and the Panama Canal were tasked with developing their own plans. While each corps area developed a plan specific to that corp area's ability, the War Plans Division retained overall control of the project.

The MID continued to play an integral role in the development of War Plan White by supplying those tasked with its development with intelligence regarding the alleged presence and movements of supposed radicals in cities like New York, Chicago, Denver, and Seattle. One report estimated that the United States harbored 322,284 Red radicals, 914,854 socialists, 42,950 socialist laborers, and 2,475,371 "unorganized Negroes." The accuracy of these reports is questionable, and their sourcing is unknown. The MID's impact on the development of each local Emergency Plan White, however, was significant. Officers drafting their respective corps area's planned around the MID's estimates, as these officers were incapable of evaluating the threat of local radicals by themselves. The MID also procured contingency plans from foreign powers, such as the United Kingdom, so that each corps area could utilize them as references.

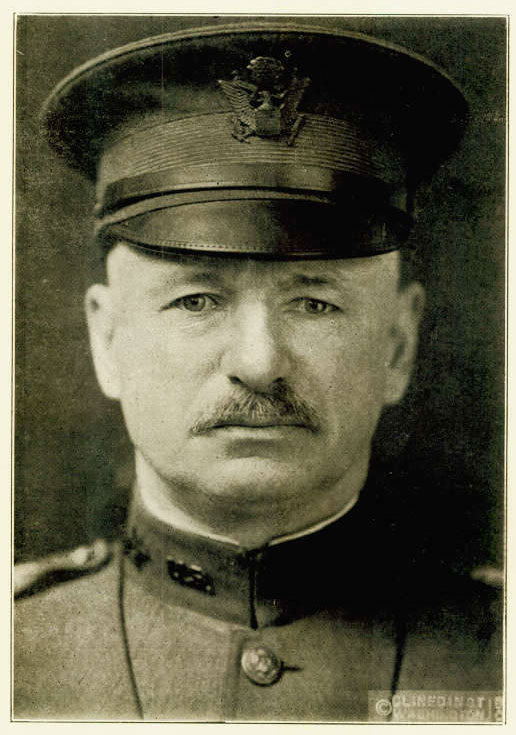
Major General William G. Haan, pictured here circa 1920, was director of the War Plans Division of the U.S. Department of War and authorized the drafting of War Plan White

== Outline ==
The War Plans Division mandated that all plans be divided into two categories: Minor Emergencies and Major Emergencies. Minor Emergencies were considered "localized disturbances, in which the Federal Government may be called upon for assistance by competent state authorities," while Major Emergencies were considered "general disturbances developing from a series of minor emergencies in which interstate commerce, mails, or functions of government are interfered with" and in which "direct action" by the federal government would be required. For each corps area, a situation would be considered a Minor Emergency if the troops available would be adequate enough to manage the disturbance. If the troops available would not be adequate enough to manage the situation, it could safely be considered a Major Emergency. The legality of federal forces being used at the discretion of state and local officials was a matter of concern within the higher echelons of the War Department (due to the Posse Comitatus Act). As a result, the plan was later revised to be in line with the law.

Each corps area had specific missions that they were tasked with in the event of the invocation of War Plan White. For example, the mission of the Navy in this situation would be to protect all naval stations, magazines, and utilities, and would also be to station naval vessels in all important coastal towns and cooperate with local Army commanders. Surplus sailors and marines would subsequently be placed at the disposal of the Army. Planners of War Plan White believed that control of the railroads would be essential to orchestrating a successful coup d'état, and subsequently drafted contingency plans for moving essential supplies, such as food, into major population centers if important railroad networks were seized or sabotaged by insurgents.

== See also ==
- United States color-coded war plans
- National Security and Homeland Security Presidential Directive
- Posse Comitatus Act
- Jayuya Uprising
- Operation Garden Plot
- Rex 84
