= British–American war =

British–American War may refer to:

- American Revolutionary War (1775–1783)
- War of 1812 (1812–1815), referred to as the "American–British war" outside of the United States and the United Kingdom.
- Pig War (1859)
- War Plan Red (1920s to 1930s)
