= Operation Alacrity =

Code name for a possible Allied seizure of Azores during WWII

Operation Alacrity was the code name for a possible Allied seizure of the Azores during World War II. It never took place because Portugal agreed to an Allied request for use of air bases. The islands were of enormous strategic value in the defeat of the German U-boats. Portugal, too weak to defend the Azores or its large colonial empire, or even its homeland, tried to stay neutral in the war. Dictator António de Oliveira Salazar was especially worried about a possible German invasion through Francoist Spain and did not want to provoke Hitler nor did he want to give Spain an excuse to side with the Axis and invade Portugal. Great Britain and the United States devised plans to set up air bases regardless of Portugal's disapproval. The plans were never put into operation. Instead in 1943 Britain requested, and Portugal agreed, to allow Britain to set up bases there. Operation Alacrity was preceded by War Plan Gray.

== Overview ==
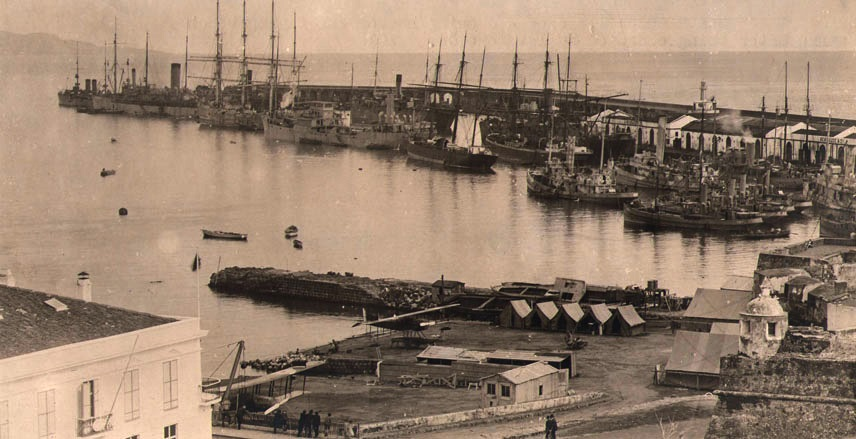
The 1st U.S. Aeronautical company in Ponta Delgada (21 January 1918); one of the first completely equipped American aviation units to serve overseas in World War I

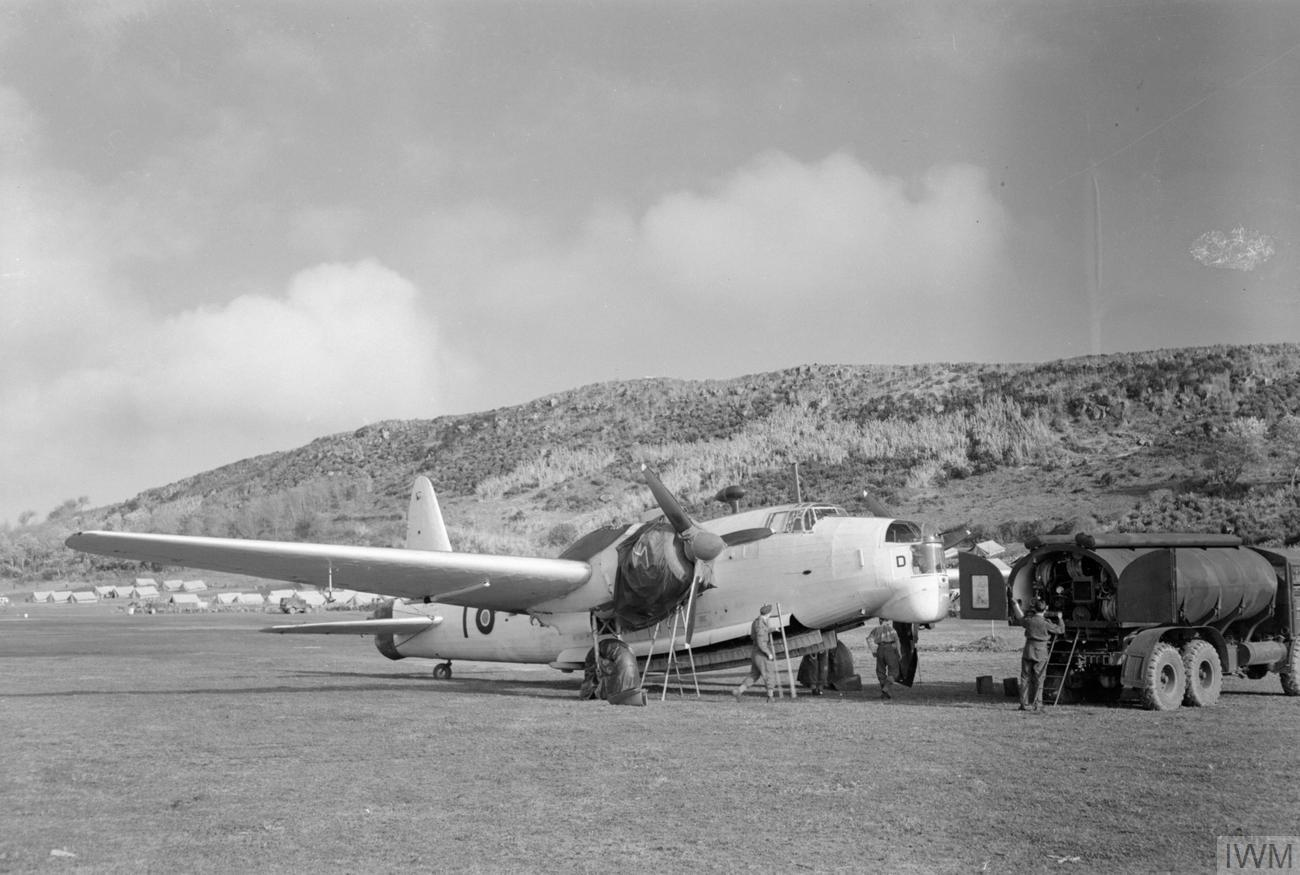
A Vickers Wellington Mk XIV, No. 172 Squadron RAF undergoing servicing at Lajes airfield during 1944

Since their colonization in the 15th century the Azores islands became a bastion of Portuguese power protecting lines of communications to its overseas empire. The advent of flight increased the strategic importance of the Azores. During World War I it allowed the US to establish naval bases in Horta and Ponta Delgada and in 1918 as an official in the Navy Department Franklin D. Roosevelt made a stopover in the Azores, and was quite taken with the strategic value of the new American naval base there.

In May 1919, with World War I ended, the first successful transatlantic flight took place from the United States to Great Britain by three U.S. Navy "Curtiss Flyer" flying boats. They used the harbor of Horta on the Azorean island of Faial as a critical stopover in their flight. In the 1930s Pan American Airways flew the first regularly scheduled commercial airliners, "Pan-Am Clippers" (Sikorsky S-40 flying boats), from Norfolk, VA to the Azores and then on to Europe.

In the outbreak of the Second World War Salazar's dislike of the Nazi regime in Germany and its imperial ambitions was tempered only by his view of the German Reich as a bastion against the spread of communism. He had favoured the Spanish nationalist cause, fearing a communist invasion of Portugal, yet he was uneasy at the prospect of a Spanish government bolstered by strong ties with the Axis. Salazar's policy of neutrality for Portugal in World War II thus included a strategic component. The country still held overseas territories that, because of their poor economic development, could not adequately defend themselves from military attack. Upon the start of World War II in 1939, the Portuguese Government announced, on 1 September, that the 600-year-old Anglo-Portuguese Alliance remained intact, but that since the British did not seek Portuguese assistance, Portugal was free to remain neutral in the war and would do so. In an aide-mémoire of 5 September 1939, the British Government confirmed the understanding.

In 1940 the Portuguese Navy finally established a permanent Air-Navy Centre in Ponta Delgada. By the spring of 1941, António de Oliveira Salazar began to believe that Germany, or its allies, would completely overrun the Iberian Peninsula. As a consequence, the Estado Novo regime pondered the withdrawal of the Portuguese government to the Azores, with the support of Britain. It was in this context that an Anglo-Portuguese working group was established to study and design the construction of new airfields in the archipelago.

During 1940–41 the US, Britain and Germany each made plans to occupy the islands. Despite the fact that the islands were only 720 miles (1,160 km) from Lisbon and 2,100 miles (3,400 km) from New York, in 1940 Roosevelt considered including both the Azores and Cape Verde Islands under the Monroe Doctrine of 1825. Roosevelt declared that German occupation of the Azores or the Cape Verde Islands would compromise US safety and on 22 May 1941 he directed the U.S. Army and Navy to draft an official plan, War Plan Gray, to occupy the Portuguese Azores.

Along May and June 1941 the American attitude towards the Azores evolved into a diplomatic incident, due to the insinuations of the American press regarding the preemptive occupation of the Azores by the US, which would later be confirmed by a Senator Claude Pepper in a landmark speech and, afterwards, by President Franklin Delano Roosevelt's speech on 27 May 1941. The Portuguese sovereignty over the islands of the archipelago of the Azores was not considered in any of the speeches, which resulted in an enormous Portuguese diplomatic campaign throughout Washington D.C.

But on 22 June 1941 the Germans invaded the Soviet Union and while so involved, the Germans were unlikely to invade Great Britain and would also have to relax their pressure on the Atlantic. In a letter dated 8 July 1941, intending to dismiss "false reports" that impaired relations between the United States and Portugal, President Roosevelt assured Salazar: "May I say first of all that, in the opinion of the Government of the United States, the continued exercise of unimpaired and sovereign jurisdiction by the Government of Portugal over the territory of Portugal itself, over the Azores and over all Portuguese colonies offers complete assurance of security to the Western Hemisphere insofar as the regions mentioned are concerned. It is, consequently, the consistent desire of the United States that there be no infringement of Portuguese sovereign control over those territories."

In 1941, Portuguese officials recognizing the dangers of the Azores in German hands, expanded the runway and sent additional troops and equipment to Lajes including Gladiator aircraft. The Portuguese declared the base capable of air defense on 11 July 1941. To emphasize Portuguese sovereignty over the territory the President of Portugal, General Carmona, made a high-profile visit to the Azores in July and August 1941 and his message was "Aqui é Portugal" (Portugal is here). (Note: On 19 July 1941 The Tablet, newspaper reported: "President Carmona Visits the Azores On Wednesday next, 23 July, General Carmona, President of the Portuguese Republic, will sail for the Azores to inspect the garrison there, which has been steadily reinforced during the past month, and is now a force of formidable dimensions. The Portuguese are showing the keenest appreciation of their responsibilities as governors of these islands which occupy such an important strategic position in the Atlantic. It is for Britain the cause of great satisfaction that they should be in the hands of a neutral and friendly Power that is both well able to defend them, and determined to do so if need be.")

However, in August 1941, during the Atlantic Conference, President Roosevelt revived the plans to seize the Azores. (Note: According to the Memorandum of Conversation, by the Under Secretary of State, Sumner Welles, 11 August 1941: it was agreed between President Roosevelt and Winston Churchill that the British Government immediately upon the return of Mr. Churchill to London would notify Dr. Salazar that the British Government could not conveniently undertake to assist in the defense of the Azores and would further inform Dr. Salazar that they therefore desired him to request the United States for such assistance. It was agreed on the part of the President that immediately upon the receipt of Such notification from Dr. Salazar the United States would send the necessary forces of occupation to the Azores and that the Brazilian Government would be simultaneously requested to send at least a token force to take part in the expedition.) But while German victories on the Eastern Front revived fears in the Atlantic all the attempts to give new life to the Azores project failed.

In December 1941, in a pre-emptive strike, Dutch and Australian troops invaded Portuguese Timor and Portugal immediately protested at the violation of her neutrality. Troops were dispatched from mainland Portugal but were still in the middle of the Indian Ocean when the Japanese invaded Portuguese Timor in January 1942. Salazar's protests concerning the violation of his country's sovereignty and neutrality by the Allies and subsequent Japanese invasion of Portuguese territory, would become a strong argument for Portugal not wanting to concede further facilities to the Allied cause.

By 1943 American military strength had significantly increased and successes in North Africa Campaign had greatly reduced the chances of a German occupation of Iberia in retaliation against an Allied seizure of the Azores. In May, in the Third Washington Conference, code-named Trident, the conferees agreed that the occupation of the Azores was essential to the conduct of the anti-U-boat campaign, extending Allied air cover for convoys and increasing harassing activities against U-boats. Delighted with the American stance Churchill cabled home with instructions: Portugal should be informed that if it refused to hand over the base, the Azores would be occupied. However, Sir Ronald Hugh Campbell, the British Ambassador considered the US State Department's suggestion "particularly ill-timed and incomprehensible at the present juncture." He recalled that at the outset of the war, Salazar had remained neutral with British approval. Campbell saw Salazar as fundamentally loyal to the Anglo-Portuguese Alliance and stated that "he [Salazar] would answer the call if it were made on grounds of dire necessity". The opposition to seize the Azores using military force also came from Anthony Eden, to whom the violation of the Portuguese neutrality could destroy the moral foundation of a true community of sovereign nations. Campbell and Eden were right, when in August 1943 the British requested military base facilities in the Azores, invoking the Anglo-Portuguese Alliance, Salazar responded favorably and quickly: Portugal allowed these bases, letting the British use the Azorean ports of Horta (on the island of Faial) and Ponta Delgada (on São Miguel Island), and the airfields of Lajes Field (on Terceira Island) and Santana Field (on São Miguel Island). (Note: The final accord pertaining to use of facilities in the Azores was signed in Lisbon on 17 August 1943 by Vice-Admiral Alfredo Botelho de Sousa acting on behalf of Lisbon, and British Air Vice-Marshal Sir Charles Medhurst According to the terms of the accord, the United Kingdom was granted: a) Facilities without restrictions for resupplying fuel, water, renewal and repairs, as compatible with local resources in the Port of Horta; b) Use of the port of Ponta Delegada restricted to facilities normally granted to a belligerent for a neutral state as outlined by the Convention Concerning the Rights and Duties of Neutral Powers in Naval War, in Section XIII of the 1907 Hague Convention; c) Unrestricted use of the field in Lajes on the island of Terceira for aviation of the British Community; d) Use of facilities in the port and bases of Terceira, necessary for the resupplying and maintenance of the Lajes Field; e) Use of facilities for planes of the British Commonwealth in the field of Rabo de Peixe on the island of São Miguel as a field site for forced landings when fuel was lacking or for other circumstances which would not permit a plane to reach the Lajes field; f) facilities for occasional refueling in the Port of Horta of British Community's hydroplanes. g) To be agreed customs facilities to expedite British war equipment. Such facilities will be equal to the war supplies shipped to Portuguese army. h) Resuplly facilities granted in "a)" and "b" can also be used by UN ships that are part of convoys. i) permission to launch a submarine communications cable between Horta and Terceira for military communication during the war and only while the war lasts.)

Franklin Roosevelt promptly informed Winston Churchill that the United States wanted to approach directly the Portuguese government for the purpose of also obtaining aviation facilities in the Azores. The negotiations for the agreement between the United States and Portugal, conducted initially by George Kennan Chargé d'Affairs in Portugal, were long and complex. The final agreement was signed on 28 November 1944 between US ambassador Raymond Henry Norweb and Salazar.

== See also ==
- Aviation in the Azores
- Lajes Field
- Portugal during World War II
- War Plan Gray
