= Plan Dog memo =

1940 American government document

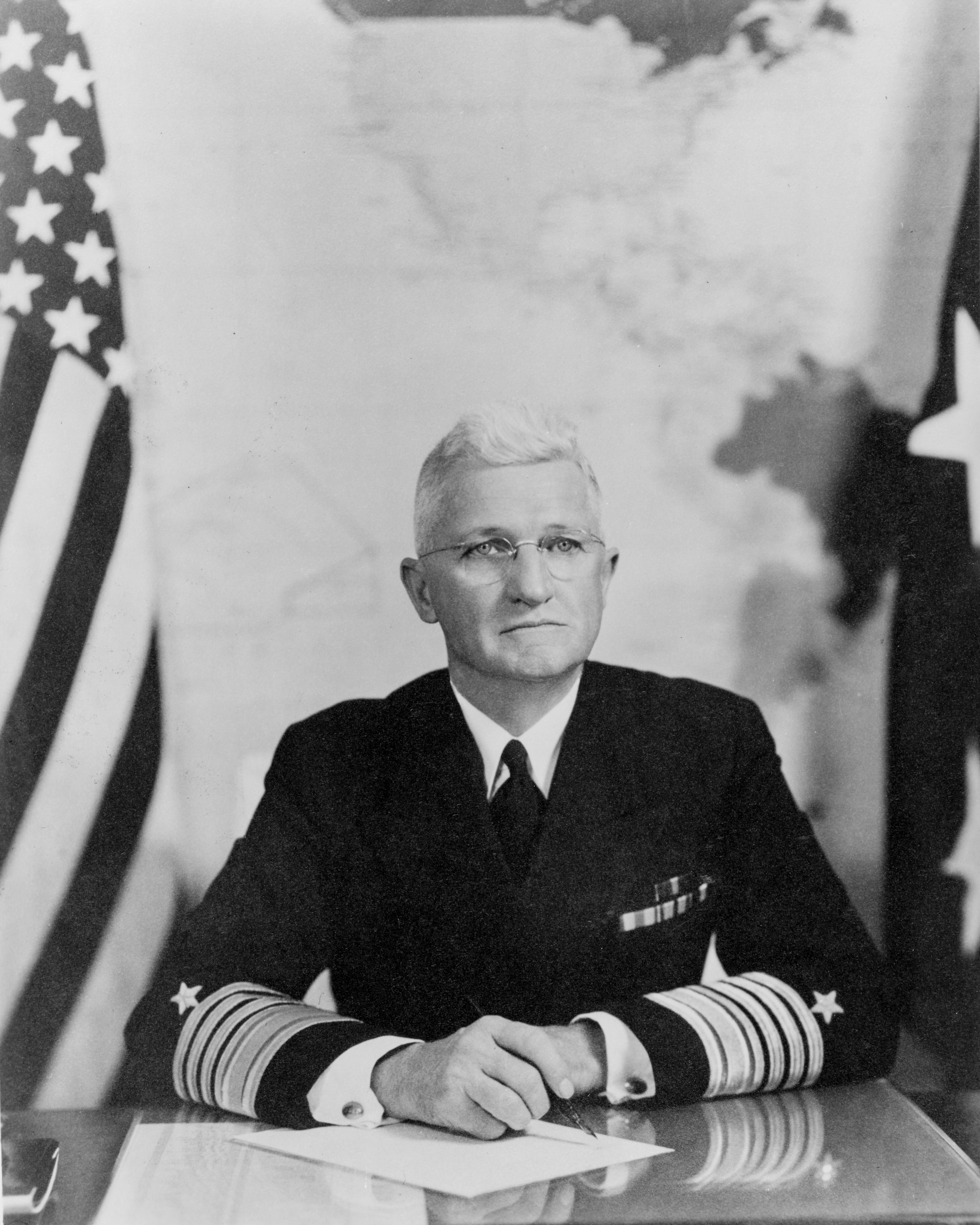
Harold Raynsford Stark authored the memo.

The Plan Dog memorandum was a 1940 U.S. government document written by Chief of Naval Operations Harold Stark. Ronald H. Spector claimed that the memo became "one of the best-known documents of World War II." Confronting the problem of an expected two-front war against Germany and Italy in Europe and against Japan in the Pacific, the memo set out the main options and suggested fighting a defensive war in the Pacific while giving strategic priority to defeating Germany and Italy. The memo laid the basis for the later American policy of Europe first.

== Background ==
During the Interwar Period, the Joint Planning Committee, which later became the Joint Chiefs of Staff, devised a series of contingency plans for dealing with the outbreak of war with various countries. The most elaborate of them, War Plan Orange, dealt with the possibility of war with Japan.

In light of the events of the late 1930s (the outbreak of the Second Sino-Japanese War, the Molotov–Ribbentrop Pact, and the German conquest of Poland and Western Europe) American planners realized that the United States faced the possibility of a two-front war in both Europe and the Pacific. War Plan Orange was withdrawn, and five "Rainbow" plans were put forward. Unlike the earlier colored plans, which had assumed a one-on-one war, the Rainbow plans contemplated both the possibility of fighting multiple enemies and the necessity of defending other western hemisphere nations and aiding Britain.

== Content ==
The memorandum built upon the conditions described in the Rainbow Five war plan. It described four possible scenarios for American participation in World War II, lettered A through E:

A - War with Japan in which [the United States] would have no allies
B - War with Japan in which [the United States] would have the British Empire... as [an] ally.
C - War with Japan in which she is aided by Germany and Italy, and in which [the United States] is or is not aided by allies.
D - War with Germany and Italy in which Japan would not initially be involved, and in which [the United States] would be allied with the British.
E - [...] consider the alternative of now remaining out of the war, and devoting [...] to exclusively building up [...] defense of the Western Hemisphere.

The memorandum, which was submitted to Roosevelt on November 12, 1940, recommended option D, the origin of its name ("Dog" was D in the Joint Army/Navy Phonetic Alphabet):

I believe that the continued existence of the British Empire, combined with building up a strong protection in our home areas, will do most to ensure the status quo in the Western Hemisphere, and to promote our principal national interests. As I have previously stated, I also believe that Great Britain requires from us very great help in the Atlantic, and possibly even on the continents of Europe or Africa, if she is to be enabled to survive. In my opinion Alternatives (A), (B), and (C) will most probably not provide the necessary degree of assistance, and, therefore, if we undertake war, that Alternative (D) is likely to be the most fruitful for the United States, particularly if we enter the war at an early date. Initially, the offensive measures adopted would, necessarily, be purely naval. Even should we intervene, final victory in Europe is not certain. I believe that the chances for success are in our favor, particularly if we insist upon full equality in the political and military direction of the war.

The memo also suggested that until hostilities broke out, the US should adopt policy A:

Until such time as the United States should decide to engage its full forces in war, I recommend that we pursue a course that will most rapidly increase the military strength of both the Army and the Navy, that is to say, adopt Alternative (A) without hostilities.

"The strategy of Plan Dog gained the support of the army and implicitly of President Roosevelt, though he never formally endorsed it. Thus at the end of 1940 a powerful consensus for strategic focus on Germany developed at the highest levels of the American government. At a meeting on January 17, 1941, Roosevelt concluded that the primary objective must be maintenance of the supply lines to Britain and ordered the navy to prepare for the escort of convoys."

== Aftermath ==
A few weeks after the attack on Pearl Harbor, at the Arcadia Conference, the United States adopted the recommendations of the memo in the form of the "Europe first" policy. Although the United States did not go entirely on the defensive in the Pacific, as the memo recommended, the European Theatre was given higher priority in resource allocation throughout the war.

The memorandum was declassified in February 1956.
