= Victory Program =

Military plan for U.S. involvement in World War II

The Victory Program (officially, Rainbow Five) was a military plan for the United States' involvement in World War II, drawn up in the second half of 1941, before the country formally entered the war. Part of a series of secret color-coded war plans developed by the Joint Planning Committee, it was exposed by the Chicago Tribune on December 4, 1941, publicly confirming the Europe first strategy and causing a political furor that lasted until the Japanese attack on Pearl Harbor three days later.

== History ==
On July 9, 1941, President Franklin D. Roosevelt, influenced by French diplomat Jean Monnet, ordered Secretary of War Henry Stimson and Secretary of the Navy Frank Knox to prepare a plan for the “overall production requirements required to defeat our potential enemies.” This plan was leaked to U.S. Senator Burton Wheeler of Montana, a prominent isolationist, who gave it to the equally isolationist editor of the Chicago Tribune, Robert R. McCormick.

In 1941, a team of officers led by General Albert Wedemeyer on behalf of General George C. Marshall drew up the Victory Program, whose premise was that the Soviet Union would be defeated that year, and that to defeat Nazi Germany would require the United States to raise by the summer of 1943 a force of 215 divisions comprising 8.7 million men.

The release of the plan caused an uproar among the isolationist bloc in the United States, but the controversy died off three days later, when news of the attack on Pearl Harbor was received and a formal declaration of war was made.

== Alternate explanation of the leak ==
Another explanation attributes the leak to British spymaster William Stephenson. In William Stevenson's 1976 book A Man Called Intrepid, Stevenson (no relation to William Stephenson) asserts that the 350-page Victory Program report was created by British intelligence and leaked to Wheeler by an unnamed Army Air Corps Captain. The theory claims that German intelligence received the report on December 3, one day before it was published in the Tribune. The theory further contends that British intelligence concocted the fake plan and leaked it purposefully to incite Hitler to declare war on the United States. Hitler subsequently declared war on December 11, 1941. It asserts Britain was confident the Japanese would attack soon thereby causing the United States to divert all attention to the Pacific and thereby reduce or eliminate support for Britain against Germany.

== See also ==
- United States color-coded war plans
