= Annexation Bill of 1866 =

Proposed complete annexation of British North America

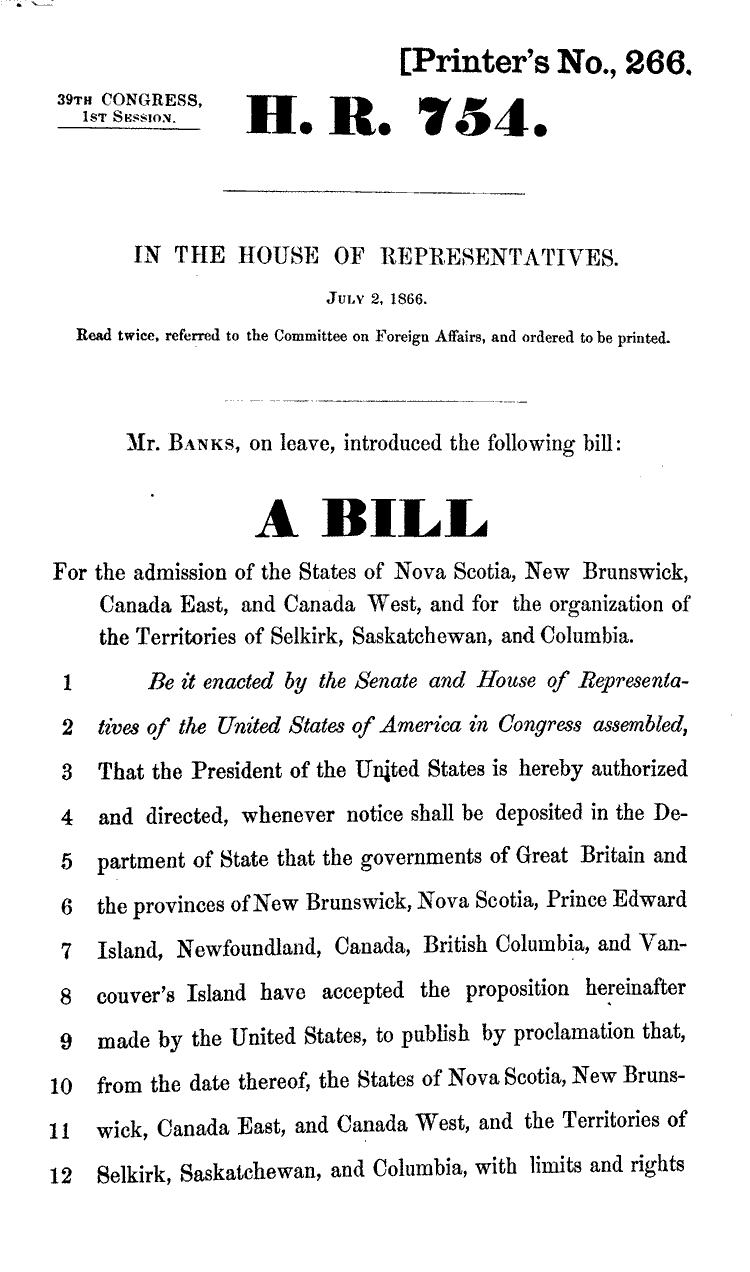
First page of the Annexation Bill of 1866

Map of the United States in 1867 had this bill been passed

The Annexation Bill of 1866 was a bill introduced on July 2, 1866, but never passed in the United States House of Representatives. It called for the annexation of British North America and the admission of its provinces as states and territories in the Union. The bill was sent to committee but never came back, was never voted upon, and did not become law. The bill never came to the United States Senate.

The bill authorized the President of the United States to, subject to the agreement of the governments of the British provinces, "publish by proclamation that, from the date thereof, the States of Nova Scotia, New Brunswick, Canada East, and Canada West, and the Territories of Selkirk, Saskatchewan, and Columbia, with limits and rights as by the act defined, are constituted and admitted as States and Territories of the United States of America." It provided for the admission of all the colonies and the purchase of the Hudson's Bay Company's lands for $10,000,000 (equivalent to $219,886,000 in 2025). The American government would assume public lands and state-owned bonds and the right to levy taxes and, in return, would take over provincial debts to the total of $85,700,000 (equivalent to $1.884426×10^{9} in 2025) and give an annual subsidy of $1,646,000 (equivalent to $36,193,000 in 2025) to the new states. In addition, the United States would connect Canada with the Maritimes by rail and spend $50,000,000 (equivalent to $1.099432×10^{9} in 2025) to complete and improve the colonial canal system.

The bill was introduced by Congressman Nathaniel Prentice Banks, a representative from Massachusetts. It was intended to appeal to Irish Americans who supported the Fenian Movement and were aggressively hostile to Britain. Indeed, much of American public opinion at the time was hostile because of Britain's perceived support for the Confederacy during the American Civil War, such as British blockade runners carrying arms supplies, the construction of CSS Alabama in a British shipyard, and tolerance of Confederate Secret Service activities in the UK and its Canadian and Bahamian colonies. There was no serious effort in Washington to annex Canada.

== Proposed states and territories ==
If successful, the Annexation Bill would have created four states and three territories from what is today Canada, listed below. Additionally, most of the Arctic Archipelago and parts of the Canadian mainland would have become unorganized territory.

- New Brunswick. Modern-day New Brunswick
- Nova Scotia. Modern-day Nova Scotia and Prince Edward Island
- Canada East. Modern-day Quebec, Newfoundland and Labrador, and part of modern-day northern Ontario
- Canada West. Modern-day southern Ontario, and part of modern-day northern Ontario.
- Selkirk Territory. Modern-day Manitoba, and parts of modern-day northwestern Ontario, Nunavut, Saskatchewan and the Northwest Territories
- Saskatchewan Territory. Modern-day Alberta, and parts of modern-day Saskatchewan, British Columbia, the Northwest Territories and Yukon.
- Columbia Territory. The part of modern-day British Columbia and Yukon west of the Rocky Mountains.

== See also ==
- Continentalism
- Expansionism
- Fenian raids
- Hunters' Lodges
- Manifest destiny
- Movements for the annexation of Canada to the United States
- Oregon boundary dispute
- War of 1812
- War Plan Red
