= War Plan Red =

US war plan against the British Empire

- War Plan Red was a U.S. strategic plan in the event of war with the British Empire. "Blue" indicated the United States while "Red" indicated the British Empire, whose territories were given their own different shades of red: Britain (Red), Newfoundland (Red), Canada (Crimson), India (Ruby), Australia (Scarlet), New Zealand (Garnet), and other areas shaded in pink which were not part of the plan. The Irish Free State, at the time independent within the British Empire, was named "Emerald" in green.
Date	1920s to 1930s
Location	North America, British West Indies and Asia-Pacific region
Status	Approved by the Secretary of War and the Secretary of the Navy; adopted by the War Department; never considered by the President or Congress; never carried out

Belligerents
United States: Philippines (as an Insular Government from 1901 to 1935 and a Commonwealth from 1935 to 1946)	British Empire: United Kingdom; Canada; Newfoundland; Australia; New Zealand; Irish Free State; India; South Africa

Commanders and leaders
The President	King George V

War Plan Red, also known as the Atlantic Strategic War Plan, was one of the color-coded war plans created by the United States Department of War during the interwar period of 1918–1939, covering scenarios related to a hypothetical war with the British Empire (the "Red" forces, likely in reference to the Red Ensign and red coat). Red is the colour traditionally used to denote British territory on most world maps. Many different war plans were prepared by mid-level officers primarily as training exercises in how to calculate the logistical and manpower requirements of fighting a war, and War Plan Red outlined those steps necessary to defend against any attempted invasion of the United States by British forces. It further discussed fighting a two-front war with both Japan and Great Britain simultaneously (as envisioned in War Plan Red-Orange).

War Plan Red was developed by the War Department after the 1927 Geneva Naval Conference, and approved in May 1930 by Secretary of War Patrick J. Hurley and Secretary of the Navy Charles Francis Adams III and updated in 1934–35. It was a routine hypothetical exercise that neither required nor received presidential or congressional approval.

With the outbreak of World War II in 1939, it was decided that no further preparations would be made but the plans were to be retained. War Plan Red was not declassified until 1974.

The war plan outlined actions that would be necessary if, for any reason, the US and UK went to war with each other. The plan assumed that the British would initially have the upper hand by virtue of the strength of the Royal Navy. The plan further assumed that Britain would probably use its base in Canada as a springboard from which to initiate an invasion of the United States. The assumption was taken that at first, the US would fight a defensive battle against invading British forces, but the US would eventually defeat the British by blockading Canada's ports and cutting off its food supplies. It is debated whether this would have been successful, however, and if the plan would have ultimately resulted in a stalemate.

== Outline ==
The Maritimes, in eastern Canada, were the primary areas of strategic importance for the plan.

War Plan Red first set out a description of Canada's geography, military resources, and transportation and went on to evaluate a series of possible pre-emptive American campaigns to invade Canada in several areas and occupy key ports and railways before British troops could provide reinforcement to the Canadians—the assumption being that Britain would use Canada as a staging point. The idea was that US attacks on Canada would prevent Britain from using Canadian resources, ports, or airbases.

The Red Ensign, likely the inspiration for the "Red" war plan designation

A key move was a joint US Army-Navy attack to capture the port city of Halifax, cutting off the Canadians from their British allies. Their next objective was to "seize Canadian Power Plants near Niagara Falls." This was to be followed by a full-scale invasion on three fronts: from Vermont to take Montreal and Quebec, from North Dakota to take over the railhead at Winnipeg, and from the Midwest to capture the strategic nickel mines of Ontario. In parallel, the US Navy was to seize the Great Lakes and blockade Canada's Atlantic and Pacific ports.

=== Zones of operation ===
The main zones of operation discussed in the plan are:

- Nova Scotia and New Brunswick:
  - The first strike with poison gas against the port city of Halifax was used to seize it, preventing the Royal Navy from using the naval base there, and cutting the undersea cable through Halifax, severing the connection between Britain and Canada.
  - The plan considers several land and sea options for the attack and concludes that a landing at St. Margarets Bay, then an undeveloped bay near Halifax, would be superior to a direct assault via the longer overland route.
  - Failing to take Halifax, the US could occupy New Brunswick by land to cut Nova Scotia off from the rest of Canada at the key railway junction in Moncton.
- Quebec and the valley of the Saint Lawrence River:
  - Occupying Montreal and Quebec City would cut the remainder of Canada off from the Eastern seaboard, preventing the movement of troops and resources in both directions.
  - The routes from northern New York to Montreal and from Vermont to Quebec are both found satisfactory for an offensive, with Quebec being the more critical target.
- Ontario and the Great Lakes area:
  - Occupying this region gains control of Toronto and most of Canada's industry and prevent Britain and Canada from using it for air or land attacks against the US industrial heartland in the Midwest.
  - The plan proposes simultaneous offensives from Buffalo across the Niagara River, from Detroit across the Detroit River into Windsor, and from Sault Ste. Marie across the St. Mary's River into Sudbury. Controlling the Great Lakes for US transport is considered logistically necessary for a continued invasion.
- Winnipeg
  - Winnipeg is a central nexus of the Canadian rail system for connecting the country.
  - The plan saw no major obstacles to an offensive from Grand Forks, North Dakota, to Winnipeg.
- Vancouver and Victoria:
  - Although Vancouver's distance from Europe reduces its importance, occupying it would deny Britain a naval base and cut Canada off from the Pacific Ocean.
  - Vancouver could be easily attacked overland from Bellingham, Washington, and Vancouver Island could be attacked by sea from Port Angeles, Washington.
  - The British Columbia port Prince Rupert has a rail connection to the rest of Canada, but a naval blockade is viewed as easy if Vancouver was taken.

=== No attacks outside Western Hemisphere first ===
Unlike the Rainbow Five plan, War Plan Red did not envision striking outside the Western Hemisphere first. Its authors saw conquering Canada as the best way to attack Britain and believed that doing so would cause London to negotiate for peace. A major problem with the plan was that it did not consider how to attack Britain if Canada were to declare its neutrality, which the authors believed was likely (the plan advised against accepting such a declaration without permission to occupy Canadian ports and some land until the war ended). The U.S. decided it should focus on the North American and Atlantic theater of operations first while leaving its Pacific outposts of the Philippines, Guam, and American Samoa alone to fend off any British, Australian, and New Zealander attacks during the early stages of the conflict.

Based on extensive war games conducted at the Naval War College, the plan rejected attacking British shipping or attempting to destroy the British fleet. The main American fleet would instead stay in the western North Atlantic to block British–Canadian traffic. The Navy would wait for a good opportunity to engage the British fleet and, if successful, would then attack British trade and colonies in the Western Hemisphere.

In 1935, War Plan Red was updated and specified which roads to use in the invasion. "The best practicable route to Vancouver is via Route 99."

American war planners had no thoughts of returning captured British territory: "The policy will be to prepare the provinces and territories of CRIMSON [Canada] and RED [Newfoundland] to become U.S. states and territories of the BLUE union upon the declaration of peace." The planners feared that should they lose the war with Britain, America would be forced to relinquish its territories to the victors, such as losing Alaska (then an organized incorporated territory) to Canada as part of the peace treaty: "It is probable that, in case RED should be successful in the war, CRIMSON will demand that Alaska be awarded to her."

== British strategy for war against the United States ==
The British military never prepared a formal plan for war with the United States during the first half of the 20th century. For instance, the government of David Lloyd George in 1919 restricted the Royal Navy from building more ships to compete with American naval growth and thereby preventing the plan's development. Like their US counterparts, most British military officers viewed cooperation with the United States as the best way to maintain world peace due to the shared culture, language, and goals, although they feared that attempts to regulate trade during a war with another nation might force a war with the US.

The British military generally believed that if war did occur, they could transport troops to Canada if asked, but nonetheless saw it as impossible to defend Canada against the much larger United States, so did not plan to render aid, as Canada's loss would not be fatal to Britain. An October 1919 memo by the British Admiralty stated if they did send British troops to Canada,

...the Empire would be committed to an unlimited land war against the U.S.A., with all advantages of time, distance and supply on the side of the U.S.A.

A full invasion of the United States was unrealistic and a naval blockade would be too slow. The Royal Navy could not use a defensive strategy of waiting for the American fleet to cross the Atlantic because Imperial trade would be left too vulnerable. Royal Navy officers believed that Britain was vulnerable to a supply blockade and that if a larger American fleet appeared near the British Isles, the Isles might quickly surrender. The officers planned to, instead, attack the American fleet from a Western Hemisphere base, likely Bermuda, while other ships based in Canada and the West Indies would attack American shipping and protect Imperial trade. The British would also bombard coastal bases and make small amphibious assaults. Colonial forces from India and Australia would help capture Manila to prevent American attacks on British trade in the Far East and perhaps a conquest of Hong Kong. The officers hoped that such acts would result in a stalemate making continued war unpopular in the United States, followed by a negotiated peace.

Canadian military officer Lieutenant Colonel James "Buster" Sutherland Brown developed an earlier counterpart to War Plan Red, Defence Scheme No. 1, on April 12, 1921. Maintaining that the best defense was a good offense, Brown planned for rapid deployment of flying columns to occupy Seattle, Great Falls, Minneapolis, and Albany. With little hope of holding the objectives, the actual idea was to divert American troops to the flanks and away from Canada, hopefully long enough for British and Commonwealth allies to arrive with reinforcements. Defence Scheme No. 1 was terminated by Chief of the General Staff Andrew McNaughton in 1928, two years before the approval of War Plan Red.

== Comparison of military and naval forces ==
Figures according to Joint Board 325 - Serial 435, as of November 11, 1929.

=== British Empire Military Forces ===
Britain
Formation	At Home	Colonies	Total
Regular Army	110,148	24,648	134,796
Colonial and Native Ind. Cps.	0	2,137	2,137
Territorial Army	138,011	0	138,011
Militia	0	2,140	2,140
Regular Army Reserve	90,906	0	90,906
Supplementary Reserve	14,061	0	14,061
Regular Army Reserve of Officers	13,983	0	13,983
Totals	367,109	28,925	396,034

Australia
Formation	Total
Permanent Force	1,811
Citizen Force	46,184
Total	47,995

New Zealand
Formation	Total
Permanent Force	514
Territorial Force	20,375
Total	20,889

Union of South Africa
Formation	Total
Permanent Force	1,072
Non-Permanent Force	8,381
Total	9,453

Irish Free State
Formation	Total
Regular Army	6,976
Reserve	10,000
Total	16,976

India
Formation	Total
British Army	59,859
Aden and elsewhere	1,728
Indian Army	166,495
Auxiliary Force	33,181
Territorial Force	20,000
Indian State Forces	36,056
Reservists	29,924
Total	347,243

Canada
Formation	Total
Permanent Force	3,533
Non-Permanent Force	52,105
Reserve of Officers	12,213
Reserves (estimated)	30,000
Total	97,851

=== British Empire Naval Forces ===
Ships
Vessel type	Atlantic Fleet	Mediterranean Fleet	China Station	America and West Indies	East Indies	African Station	New Zealand	Australia	Canada	Home Waters and Reserve	Total
Battleships	4	8	0	0	0	0	0	0	0	4	16
Battle Cruisers	4	0	0	0	0	0	0	0	0	0	4
Cruisers	5	10	6	5	3	2	3	4	0	14	52
Destroyer Leaders	2	5	1	0	0	0	0	1	0	7	16
Destroyers	19	36	8	0	0	0	0	11	2	64	140
Minelayers	1	0	0	0	0	0	0	0	0	0	1
Minesweepers	0	9	2	0	0	0	0	0	4	18	33
Submarines	0	7	6	0	0	0	0	2	0	35	50
Aircraft Carriers	2	2	1	0	0	0	0	0	0	1	6

Personnel
Branch	Officers	Enlisted	Totals
Royal Navy	7,535	81,029	88,564
Royal Marines	430	9,319	10,429
Royal Canadian Navy	76	450	526
Royal Australian Navy	497	4,764	5,261
New Zealand Division of the Royal Navy	66	905	971
South African Naval Service	15	121	136
Royal Air Force assigned to Royal Navy	300	2,800	3,100
Civilian Crews of Naval Auxiliaries	255	3,900	4,155
Special Reserve of Engineer Officers	124	0	124
Emergency Officers	225	0	225
Royal Fleet Reserve	0	21,914	21,914
Royal Naval Reserve	1,679	7,855	9,534
Royal Naval Volunteer Reserve	420	3,616	4,036
Royal Navy Auxiliary Sick Berth Reserve	0	1,275	1,275
Australian Naval Reserve	815	8,425	9,267
Canadian Naval Reserve	102	931	1,033
New Zealand Naval Reserve	43	488	531
South African Naval Reserve	50	653	703
Totals	12,632	152,240	161,594

== See also ==
- War of 1812
- Aroostook War (1838–1839)
- Pig War (1859)
- Trent Affair (1861)
- Chesapeake Affair (1863)
- Fenian raids (1866–71)
- Fort Whoop-Up (1869–74)
- Annexation Bill of 1866
- Canadian annexation proposal by Donald Trump
- Defence Scheme No. 1
- War Plan Black
- War Plan Orange
- We Stand On Guard
