= United States color-coded war plans =

Plans in the 1920s and 1930s outlining US strategies for various war scenarios

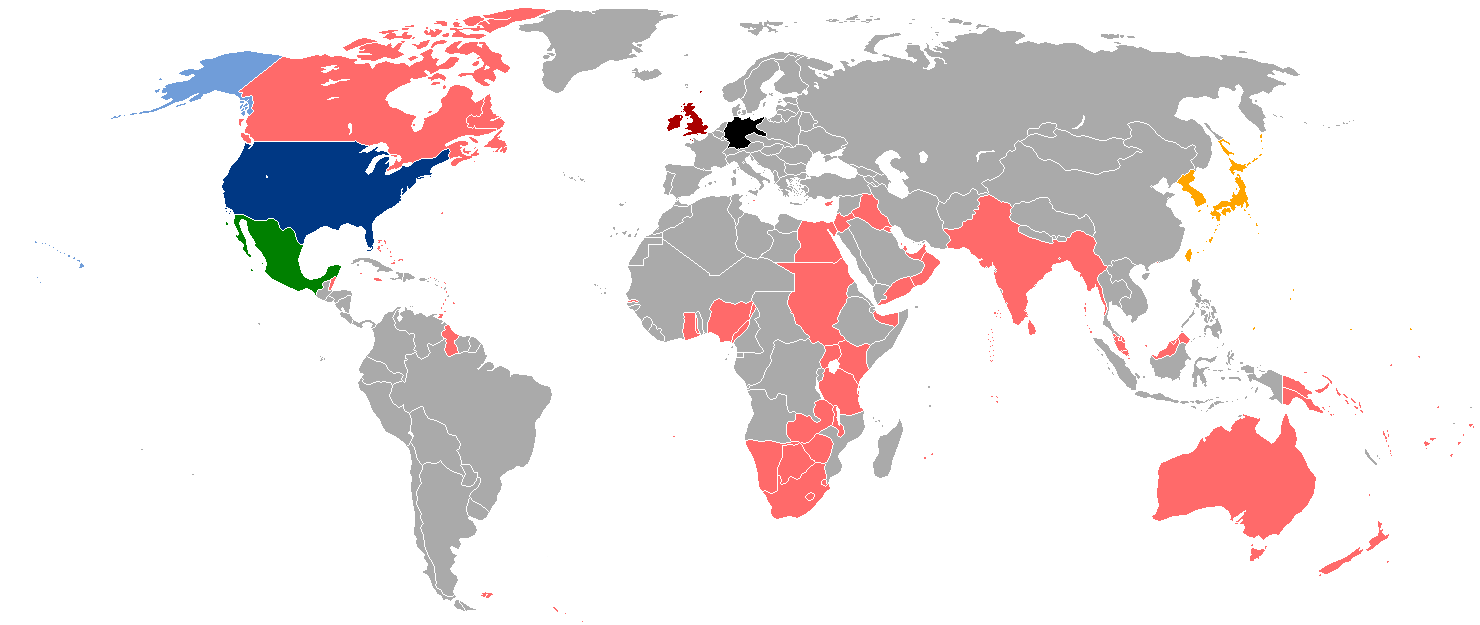
United States color-coded war plans (as of 1921)

In the 1920s and 1930s, the Joint Planning Committee of the United States Armed Forces developed strategies for various potential wartime scenarios, each named for a color. The plans were withdrawn when World War II broke out in 1939; they were replaced by five "Rainbow" plans developed for a two-ocean war against multiple enemies.

== List of color plans ==
The following plans are known to have existed:

War Plan Black
A plan for war with the German Empire . The best-known version of Black was conceived as a contingency plan during World War I in case France fell, and the Germans attempted to seize the French West Indies in the Caribbean Sea, or launch an attack on the eastern seaboard.
War Plan Gray
There were two war plans named Gray. The first dealt with Central America and the Caribbean, and the second dealt with invading the Portuguese Azores.
War Plan White
Dealt with a domestic uprising in the US and later evolved to Operation Garden Plot, the general US military plan for civil disturbances and peaceful protests. Parts of War Plan White were used to deal with the Bonus Expeditionary Force in 1932. Communist insurgents were considered the most likely threat by the authors of War Plan White.
War Plan Brown
Dealt with an uprising in the Philippines.
War Plan Tan
Intervention in Cuba.
War Plan Red
Plan for the British Empire, with specific subvariants for the British dominions:
- Crimson: Canada
- Ruby: India
- Scarlet: Australia
- Garnet: New Zealand
- Emerald: Irish Free State
War Plan Orange
Plan for the Empire of Japan.
War Plan Red-Orange
Considered a two-front war with the United States (Blue) opposing the Empire of Japan (Orange) and the British Empire (Red) simultaneously (the Anglo-Japanese Alliance). This analysis led to the understanding that the United States did not have the resources to fight a two-front war. As a result, it was decided that one front should be prioritized for offense while the other was to be defensive, for war against British territories in North America and the Atlantic and against Britain and Japan in the Pacific respectively. This decision resulted in the Plan Dog memo during World War II, replacing Britain with Germany and Italy instead.
War Plan Yellow
Dealt with war in China—specifically, anticipating a repeat of the Boxer Uprising (1899–1901). War Plan Yellow would deploy the US Army in coalition with other imperial forces to suppress indigenous discontent in the Shanghai International Settlement and Beijing Legation Quarter, with chemical weapons if necessary.
War Plan Gold
Involved war with France and/or France's Caribbean colonies.
War Plan Green
Involved war with Mexico or what was known as "Mexican Domestic Intervention" in order to defeat rebel forces and establish a pro-American government. War Plan Green was officially canceled in 1946.
War Plan Blue
Covered defensive plans and preparations that the United States should take in times of peace.
War Plan Indigo
Involved an occupation of Iceland. In 1941, while Denmark was under German occupation, the US actually did occupy Iceland, relieving British units during the Battle of the Atlantic.
War Plan Purple
Dealt with invading a South American republic.
War Plan Violet
Covered Latin America.

No war plan has been constructed toward the Soviet Union.

== Colors ==
The desire for the Army and Navy to utilize the same symbols for their plans gave rise to the use of colors in US war planning. By the end of 1904, the Joint Board had adopted a system of hues, symbols, and shorthand names to represent nations. Many war plans became known by the color of the country to which they were related, a convention that lasted through World War II. As the convention of using colors took root, some were eventually reused, such as Grey, which originally referred to Italy but eventually became a plan for the capture and occupation of Portugal's Azores. In all the plans, the US referred to itself as "Blue".

The plan that received the most consideration was War Plan Orange, a series of contingency plans for fighting a war with Japan alone, outlined unofficially in 1919 and officially in 1924. Orange formed some of the basis for the actual campaign against Japan in World War II and included the huge economic blockade from mainland China and the plans for interning the Japanese American population.

War Plan Red was a plan for war against the British Empire. British dominions and colonies had war plans of different shades of red: the United Kingdom was "Red", Canada "Crimson", India "Ruby", Australia "Scarlet", and New Zealand "Garnet". Ireland, at the time a free state within the British Empire, was named "Emerald".

War Plan Black was a plan for war with Germany. The best-known version of Black was conceived as a contingency plan during World War I in case France fell and the Germans attempted to seize French possessions in the Caribbean or launch an attack on the eastern seaboard.

== Considerations ==
Many of the war plans were extremely unlikely given the state of international relations in the 1920s and were entirely in keeping with the military planning of other nation-states. Often, junior military officers were given the task of updating each plan to keep them trained and busy (especially in the case of War Plan Crimson, the invasion of Canada). Some of the war plan colors were revised over time, possibly resulting in confusion.

Although the US had fought its most recent war against Germany and would fight another within twenty years, intense domestic pressure emerged for the Army to halt when it became known that the Army was constructing a plan for a war with Germany; isolationists opposed any consideration of involvement in a future European conflict. This may have encouraged the Army to focus on more speculative scenarios for planning exercises.

== Americas ==
=== War Plan Green ===
During the 1910s, relations between Mexico and the United States were often volatile. In 1912, US President William Howard Taft considered sending an expeditionary force to protect foreign-owned property from damage during the Mexican Revolution. Thus, War Plan Green was developed. In 1916, US troops under General John Pershing invaded Mexico in search of Pancho Villa, whose army had attacked Columbus, New Mexico; earlier, American naval forces had bombarded and seized the Mexican port of Veracruz and forced Victoriano Huerta to resign the presidency. In 1917, British intelligence intercepted a telegram from the German foreign ministry to its embassy in Mexico City offering an alliance against the United States and assistance in the Mexican reconquest of the Southwest. Released to American newspapers, the Zimmermann Telegram helped turn American opinion against Germany and further poisoned the atmosphere between the US and Mexico. Relations with Mexico remained tense into the 1920s and 1930s.

=== Beyond Mexico ===
Between the American Civil War and World War I, the American military intervened in the affairs of Latin American countries, including Colombia, Panama, Haiti, Cuba, and Nicaragua. In doing so, parts of "Gray" and "Purple" plans were considered although never officially activated.

=== Multilateral war plans ===
Some plans were expanded to include war against a coalition of hostile powers. The most detailed was War Plan Red-Orange, which detailed a two-front war against Britain and Japan. This was the contingency which most worried US war planners, since it entailed a two-ocean war against major naval powers. Although the 1902 Anglo-Japanese Alliance was terminated by the 1921 Four-Power Treaty, American generals did not rule out the possibility of Britain wanting to seek an alliance with Japan again if war ever broke out. Theories developed in War Plan Red-Orange were useful during World War II, when the United States engaged the Axis powers in both the Atlantic and Pacific simultaneously.

== Rainbow plans ==
Japan took the opportunity afforded by World War I to establish itself as a major strategic power in the Pacific Ocean. Most American officials and planners then considered a war with Japan to be highly likely. The fear lessened when the civilian government of Japan temporarily halted its program of military expansion, but it was resumed in 1931. War Plan Orange was the longest and most detailed of the color-designated plans.

However, following the Second Sino-Japanese War in 1937 and events in Europe in 1938—1940 (the Anschluss, the Munich Agreement, the German occupation of Czechoslovakia, the Molotov–Ribbentrop Pact and the German invasion of Poland and Western Europe), American war planners realized that the United States faced war on multiple fronts against a coalition of enemies. Therefore, the Joint Planning Board developed a new series of "Rainbow" plans—the term being a logical extension of the previous "color" plans.

- Rainbow 1 was a plan for a defensive war to protect the United States and the Western Hemisphere north of ten degrees [south] latitude. In such a war, the United States was assumed to be without major allies.
- Rainbow 2 was identical to Rainbow 1, except for assuming that the United States would be allied with France and the United Kingdom.
- Rainbow 3 was a repetition of the Orange plan, with the provision that the hemisphere defense would first be secured, as provided in Rainbow 1.
- Rainbow 4 was based on the same assumptions as Rainbow 1 but extended the American mission to include defense of the entire Western hemisphere.
- Rainbow 5, destined to be the basis for American strategy in World War II, assumed that the United States was allied with Britain and France and additionally provided for offensive operations by American forces in Europe, Africa, or both.

The assumptions and plans for Rainbow 5 were discussed extensively in the Plan Dog memo, which concluded ultimately that the United States would adhere to a Europe first strategy in World War II.

=== Leak of the Rainbow 5 plan ===
On December 4, 1941, three days before the Japanese attack on Pearl Harbor, the Chicago Tribune, with the headline "F. D. R.'s War Plans!", along with The Times Herald of Washington, D.C., published the Rainbow Five plan. The articles, both by the Tribune's Washington correspondent, Chesly Manly, revealed plans to build a 10-million-man Army with a five-million-man expeditionary force to be sent to Europe by 1943 in order to defeat Nazi Germany.

The publication ignited a storm of controversy in the US, with isolationist politicians claiming Roosevelt was violating his pledge to keep the country out of the European war, while Secretary of War Henry L. Stimson accused the newspapers of unpatriotic behavior and suggested it would be a dereliction of duty for the War Department not to plan for every contingency. Germany publicly ridiculed the plan the next day, doubting "whether the entire world shipping would be sufficient to transport 5,000,000 troops to Europe, much less supply them there."

Privately, the German general staff saw the publication of the plans as extremely valuable intelligence and used its threat of a five-million-man US force in 1943 to argue for temporarily stalling the faltering invasion of the Soviet Union, and concentrating German forces in the west. Adolf Hitler vehemently rejected that idea. The source of the leak was determined in 1962 in an autobiography by former Senator Burton Wheeler (D-Montana) when he stated that it was he who leaked the secret defense plans to the press.

== See also ==
- German color-coded plans:
  - Case Blue
  - Case Brown
  - Case Green: Czechoslovakia, Ireland and Switzerland
  - Case Red
  - Case Yellow
