= Eli K. Cole =

American Marine Corps general (1867–1929)

Eli Kelley Cole
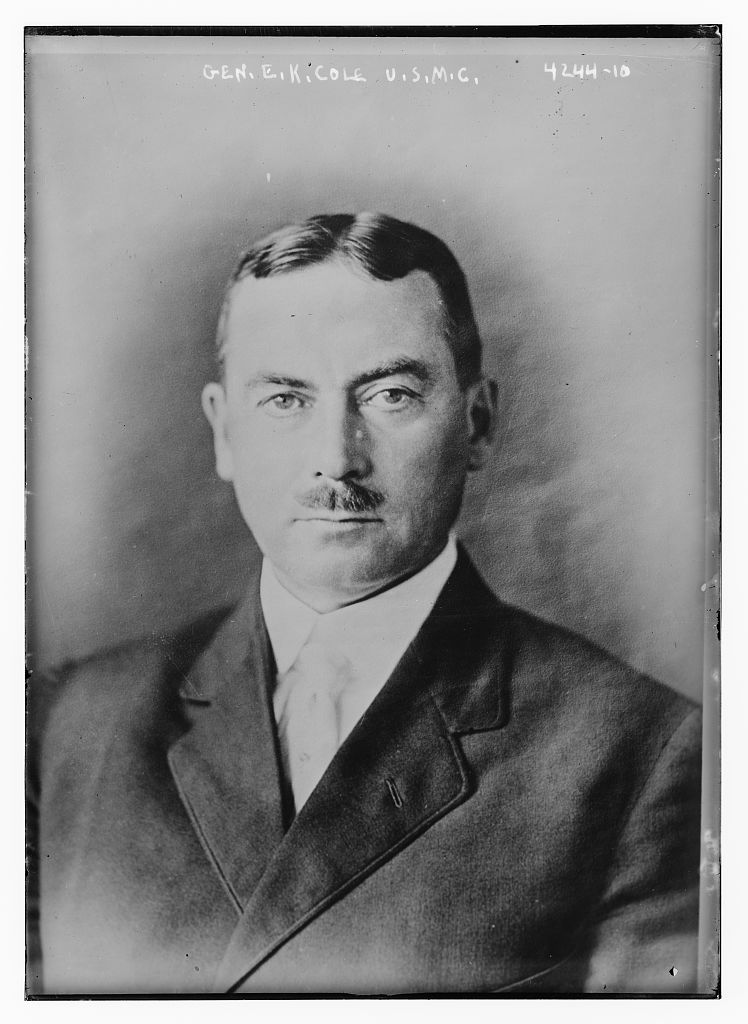
- Eli Kelley Cole in 1917
- Born: September 1, 1867; Carmel, New York, U.S.
- Died: July 4, 1929 (aged 61); San Francisco, California, U.S.
- Burial place: Carmel, New York
- Military career
- Allegiance: United States of America
- Branch: United States Navy; United States Marine Corps
- Service years: 1888–1890 (USN); 1890–1929 (USMC)
- Rank: Major General
- Commands: Assistant Commandant of the Marine Corps; Department of the Pacific; 41st Infantry Division
- Conflicts: Banana Wars
- Awards: Navy Cross

Eli Kelley Cole (September 1, 1867 – July 4, 1929) was the first assistant commandant of the Marine Corps from 1911 to 1915. He also briefly commanded the 41st Infantry Division at the end of World War I. Cole was awarded the Navy Cross for his service as "Commanding Officer of the First Provisional Brigade of Marines" during the Haitian campaign from 1915 to 1917.

Cole graduated from the United States Naval Academy in 1888. He then served two years as an ensign in the U.S. Navy before transferring to the U.S. Marine Corps.
