= Operation Garden Plot =

General US Army and National Guard Plan in response to civil disturbances

The Department of Defense Civil Disturbance Plan, also known by its cryptonym GARDEN PLOT, was a general US Army and National Guard plan to respond to major domestic civil disturbances within the United States. The plan was developed in response to the civil disorders of the 1960s and fell under the control of the U.S. Northern Command (NORTHCOM). It provided Federal military and law enforcement assistance to local governments during times of major civil disturbances.

The Garden Plot plan – drafted after the Watts, Newark, and Detroit riots – captures the acrimonious times when the document was drawn up. The "Plot" warns against "racial unrest," as well as "anti-draft" and "anti-Vietnam" elements."

The Pentagon activated Garden Plot to restore order during the 1992 Los Angeles Riots. Garden Plot was superseded by USNORTHCOM Concept Plan (CONPLAN) 2502 following the September 11, 2001 attacks on the United States. Under Homeland Security restructuring, it has been suggested that similar models be followed:

Oversight of these homeland security missions should be provided by the National Guard Bureau based on the long-standing Garden Plot model in which National Guard units are trained and equipped to support civil authorities in crowd control and civil disturbance missions.

— Major General Richard C. Alexander, ARNGUS (Ret.), Executive Director, National Guard Association of the United States, Testimony in the Senate Appropriations Committee Hearing on Homeland Defense, April 11, 2002

== See also ==
- Huston Plan
- National Security and Homeland Security Presidential Directive
- Posse Comitatus Act
- Rex 84
- United States color-coded war plans
