= Europe first =

Allied grand strategy policy in World War II

Europe first, also known as Germany first, was the key element of the grand strategy agreed upon by the United States and the United Kingdom during World War II after the United States joined the war in December 1941. According to this policy, the United States and the United Kingdom would use the preponderance of their resources to subdue Nazi Germany and Fascist Italy in Europe first. Simultaneously, they would fight a holding action against Japan in the Pacific, using fewer resources. After the defeat of Germany—considered the greatest threat to the UK and the Soviet Union—all Allied forces could be concentrated against Japan.

At the December 1941 Arcadia Conference between President Franklin Roosevelt and Prime Minister Winston Churchill in Washington, shortly after the United States entered the War, the decision for the "Europe First" strategy was affirmed. However, U.S. statistics show that the United States devoted more resources in the early part of the war to stopping the advance of Japan, and not until 1944 was a clear preponderance of U.S. resources allocated toward the defeat of Germany.

== Grand strategy ==
Germany was the United Kingdom's primary threat, especially after the Fall of France in 1940, which saw Germany overrun most of the countries of Western Europe, leaving the United Kingdom alone to combat Germany. Germany's threatened invasion of the UK, Operation Sea Lion, was averted by its failure to establish air superiority in the Battle of Britain, and by its marked inferiority in naval power. At the same time, war with Japan in East Asia seemed increasingly likely. Although the U.S. was not yet at war, it met with the UK on several occasions to formulate joint strategies. In the March 29, 1941 report of the ABC-1 conference, the Americans and British agreed that their strategic objectives were: (1) "The early defeat of Germany as the predominant member of the Axis with the principal military effort of the United States being exerted in the Atlantic and European area;" and (2) "A strategic defensive in the Far East."

Thus, the Americans concurred with the British in the grand strategy of "Europe first" (or "Germany first") in carrying out military operations in World War II. The UK feared that, if the United States was diverted from its main focus in Europe to the Pacific (Japan), Hitler might crush the Soviet Union, and would then become an unconquerable fortress in Europe. The wound inflicted on the United States by Japan's attack on the US at Pearl Harbor on December 7, 1941, did not result in a change in U.S. policy. Churchill hastened to Washington shortly after Pearl Harbor for the Arcadia Conference to ensure that the Americans didn't have second thoughts about Europe First. In 1941, Roosevelt appointed John Gilbert Winant ambassador to Britain, and Winant remained in that post until he resigned in March 1946. In a 2010 book, Citizens of London: The Americans Who Stood with Britain in Its Darkest, Finest Hour, author Lynne Olson described Winant as dramatically changing the U.S. stance as ambassador when succeeding pro-appeasement ambassador Joseph P. Kennedy Sr. In the spring of 1941, W. Averell Harriman served President Franklin D. Roosevelt as a special envoy to Europe and helped coordinate the Lend-Lease program. The two countries reaffirmed that, "notwithstanding the entry of Japan into the War, our view remains that Germany is still the prime enemy and her defeat is the key to victory. Once Germany is defeated the collapse of Italy and the defeat of Japan must follow."

== United States ==
The Europe first strategy, in conjunction with a "holding action" against Japan in the Pacific, had originally been proposed to Roosevelt by the U.S. military in 1940. When Germany declared war on the United States on December 11, 1941, the United States faced a decision about how to allocate resources between these two separate theaters of war. On the one hand, Japan had attacked the United States directly at Pearl Harbor, and the Japanese Navy threatened United States territory in a way that Germany, with a limited surface fleet, was not in a position to do. On the other hand, Germany was considered the stronger and more dangerous threat to Europe; and Germany's geographical proximity to the UK and the Soviet Union was a much greater threat to their survival.

Prior to the attack on Pearl Harbor, American planners foresaw the possibility of a two-front war. Chief of Naval Operations Harold Rainsford Stark authored the Plan Dog memo, which advocated concentrating on victory in Europe while staying on the defensive in the Pacific. However, the U.S. reassurance to the UK notwithstanding, the U.S.'s immediate concern was with Japan. As the Army Chief of Staff General George Marshall later said, "we had a fair understanding of what we had best do rather than the necessity of engaging in prolonged conversations... This understanding, which included a recognition that Germany was the main enemy and that the major effort would be made initially in Europe, was obviously not applicable in the present situation. Of first importance now was the necessity to check the Japanese." Nonetheless, Marshall and other U.S. generals advocated the invasion of northern Europe in 1943, which the British rejected. After Churchill pressed for a landing in French North Africa in 1942, Marshall suggested instead to Roosevelt that the U.S. abandon the Germany-first strategy and take the offensive in the Pacific. Roosevelt "disapproved" the proposal saying it would do nothing to help Russia. With Roosevelt's support, and Marshall unable to persuade the British to change their minds, in July 1942 Operation Torch was scheduled for later that year.

The Europe First strategy remained in effect throughout the war but the terms "holding action" and "limited offensive" in the Pacific were subject to interpretation and modification by U.S. senior military commanders and at allied leaders conferences. The strategic situation in the Pacific and related logistical requirements dominated the United States' actions after its entry into the war and led to an initial focus on the Pacific. Even in the later stages of the war, there was intense competition for resources as operations in both regions were scaled up.

== Opposition ==
The "Europe First" strategy was not well received by factions of the US military, driving a wedge between the Navy and the Army. While USN Fleet Admiral Ernest King was a strong believer in "Europe First", contrary to British perceptions, his natural aggression did not permit him to leave resources idle in the Atlantic that could be utilized in the Pacific, especially when "it was doubtful when—if ever—the British would consent to a cross-Channel operation". King once complained that the Pacific deserved 30% of Allied resources but was getting only 15%, perhaps partly because the two men did not get along, the combined influence of King and General Douglas MacArthur increased the allocation of resources to the Pacific War.

General Hastings Ismay, chief of staff to Winston Churchill, described King as:

tough as nails and carried himself as stiffly as a poker. He was blunt and stand-offish, almost to the point of rudeness. At the start, he was intolerant and suspicious of all things British, especially the Royal Navy; but he was almost equally intolerant and suspicious of the American Army. War against Japan was the problem to which he had devoted the study of a lifetime, and he resented the idea of American resources being used for any other purpose than to destroy Japanese. He mistrusted Churchill's powers of advocacy, and was apprehensive that he would wheedle President Roosevelt into neglecting the war in the Pacific.

At the January 1943 Casablanca Conference, King was accused by Field Marshal Sir Alan Brooke, Chief of the Imperial General Staff, of favoring the Pacific war, and the argument became heated. The combative US general Joseph Stilwell wrote: "Brooke got nasty, and King got good and sore. King almost climbed over the table at Brooke. God, he was mad. I wished he had socked him."

The American people favored early action against Japan. In one of the few public opinion polls taken during the war, in February 1943, 53% of Americans said that Japan was the "chief enemy" compared to 34% choosing Germany. A later poll showed that 82% of Americans believed that the Japanese were more "cruel at heart" than Germans. As a consequence of the immediate threat and the need to contain Japan's advance across the Pacific, American resources allocated to the defeat of Japan initially exceeded those allocated to Europe. In the first six months the U.S. was in the war, the U.S. army deployed more than 300,000 soldiers overseas to the Pacific while less than 100,000 were sent to Europe. The U.S.'s first major offensive during World War II was in the Pacific: Guadalcanal in August 1942. Concurrently, Australian forces attacked and pushed back the Japanese in the Kokoda Track Campaign in New Guinea.

== Analysis ==
Three U.S. Army divisions were deployed to Australia and New Zealand in February and March 1942 at the request of Churchill so that divisions from those countries could remain on operations in the Middle East. Through this sizeable deployment to the Pacific, the U.S. aided the Europe First strategy by defending Australia and New Zealand and thus enabling experienced troops from those countries to remain deployed against German forces. Nonetheless, the inability of the two allies to mount an invasion of German-controlled northern Europe in 1943 permitted the U.S. to maintain more military forces arrayed against Japan than Germany during the first two years the U.S. was in the war. As late as December 1943, the balance was nearly even. Against Japan, the U.S. had deployed 1,873,023 men, 7,857 aircraft, and 713 warships. Against Germany the totals were 1,810,367 men, 8,807 airplanes, and 515 warships. In early 1944, the military buildup of American forces for the invasion of France shifted the balance of American resources toward the European theater and made Europe First a reality. However, despite the majority of American resources going into Europe in 1944, the U.S. still had sufficient resources to mount several major military operations in the Pacific that year: Saipan (June 1944); Guam (July 1944); Peleliu (September 1944); and the liberation of the Philippines at Leyte in October 1944.

In 1944 and 1945, the balance of U.S. resources shifted heavily toward Europe as the Europe First strategy became a reality rather than just a stated objective. At war's end in Europe, the U.S. Army had 47 divisions in Europe and 21 divisions, plus 6 Marine Corps divisions, in the Pacific. 78% of Army and Army Air Force manpower was deployed against Germany versus 22% deployed in the Pacific. The plan to invade Japan envisioned that 15 of the European divisions (and the Eighth Air Force) would be transferred to the Pacific.

The uncritical view that "Europe First" dictated the allocation of resources throughout the war has caused many scholars to underestimate the resources required to defeat Japan. For example, historian H. P. Willmott stated that the United States "allocated little more than one-quarter of her total war effort to the struggle against Japan." That may be an underestimate which does not take into account that, according to official U.S. statistics, 70% of the U.S. Navy and all the Marine Corps were deployed in the Pacific as well as the 22% of the Army deployed to the Pacific at the time of Germany's surrender in May 1945.

== See also ==
- Asia First
- Declarations of war during World War II
- Diplomatic history of World War II
- List of Allied World War II conferences
- Military history of the United Kingdom during World War II
- Military history of the United States during World War II
- Plan Dog memo
- Theaters of World War II
  - European
  - Mediterranean and Middle East
  - Pacific
