= Leapfrogging (strategy) =

Military strategy

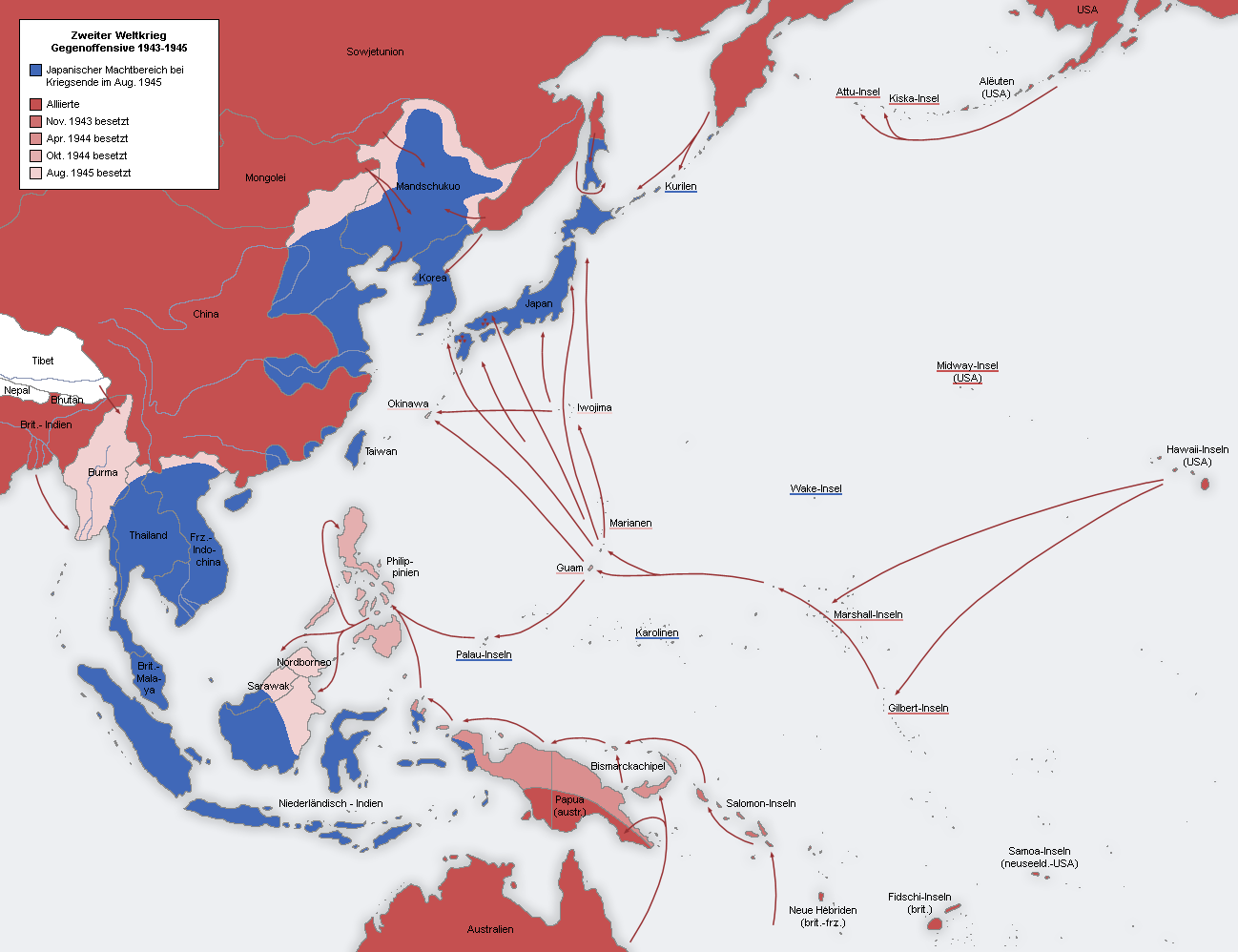
Allied island-hopping campaign 1943–1945: Japanese-held territory Aug. 1945 Allied territory Occupied Nov. 1943 Occupied Apr. 1944 Occupied Oct. 1944 Occupied Aug. 1945

Leapfrogging was an amphibious military strategy employed by the Allies in the Pacific War against the Empire of Japan during World War II. The key concept was to bypass heavily fortified enemy islands instead of trying to capture every island in sequence en route to a final target. The reasoning was that those heavily fortified islands could simply be cut off from their supply chains (leading to their eventual capitulation) rather than needing to be overwhelmed by superior force, thus speeding up progress and reducing losses of troops and material. The strategy proved to be successful; although some Japanese garrisons survived longer than the Allies expected, the enemy troops were eventually completely isolated from their main supply chains and incapable of organizing an effective defense against Allied forces.

== History ==
=== Background ===
As the 20th century dawned, the U.S. had several interests in the western Pacific to defend; namely, its colonies – the Philippines and Guam – which the U.S. had gained as a result of the 1898 Spanish–American War, and access to the Chinese markets. After Japan's victories in the Sino-Japanese War and the Russo-Japanese War, the U.S. began to regard Japan as a potential threat to its interests in the western Pacific. This antagonism was intensified by Japan's objections to an attempt to annex Hawaii to the U.S. and by Japan's objections to discrimination against Japanese immigrants both in Hawaii and California. As a result, as early as 1897 the U.S. Navy began to draft war plans against Japan, which were eventually codenamed "War Plan Orange". The war plan of 1911, which was drafted under Rear Admiral Raymond P. Rodgers, included an island-hopping strategy for approaching Japan.

After World War I, the Treaty of Versailles gave Japan a mandate over former German colonies in the western Pacific—specifically, the Mariana, Marshall, and the Caroline Islands. If these islands were fortified, Japan could in principle deny the U.S. access to its interests in the western Pacific. Therefore, in 1921, Major Earl Hancock Ellis of the U.S. Marine Corps drafted "Plan 712, Advanced Base Operations in Micronesia," a plan for war against Japan. Although it envisaged an advance through Micronesia, it called for all the islands in a group to be reduced, rather than for some to be bypassed. The strategy quite reasonably assumed U.S. naval superiority, which the U.S. navy did not possess in the wake of the Japanese attack on Pearl Harbor. This forced the adoption of a purely defensive strategy.

=== Rationale and use ===
The leapfrogging strategy was limited by the range of land-based aircraft, unless aircraft carriers of the Pacific Fleet could assist. Troops on islands which had been bypassed, such as the major base at Rabaul, were useless to the Japanese war effort and left to "wither on the vine". General Douglas MacArthur's Operation Reckless and Operation Persecution were successful Allied practices of leapfrogging in terms of landing on lightly guarded beaches and very low casualties but cutting off Japanese troops hundreds of miles away from their supply routes.

MacArthur said his version of leapfrogging was different from what he called island hopping, which was the style favored by the Central Pacific Area commanded by Admiral Chester W. Nimitz where direct assaults on heavily defended beaches and islands led to massive casualties at Tarawa, Saipan, Guam, Iwo Jima, and Okinawa. MacArthur explained his and William Halsey's strategy:

My strategic conception for the Pacific Theater, which I outlined after the Papuan Campaign and have since consistently advocated, contemplates massive strokes against only main strategic objectives, utilizing surprise and air-ground striking power supported and assisted by the fleet. This is the very opposite of what is termed "island hopping" which is the gradual pushing back of the enemy by direct frontal pressure with the consequent heavy casualties which will certainly be involved. Key points must of course be taken but a wise choice of such will obviate the need for storming the mass of islands now in enemy possession. "Island hopping" with extravagant losses and slow progress ... is not my idea of how to end the war as soon and as cheaply as possible. New conditions require for solution and new weapons require for maximum application new and imaginative methods. Wars are never won in the past.

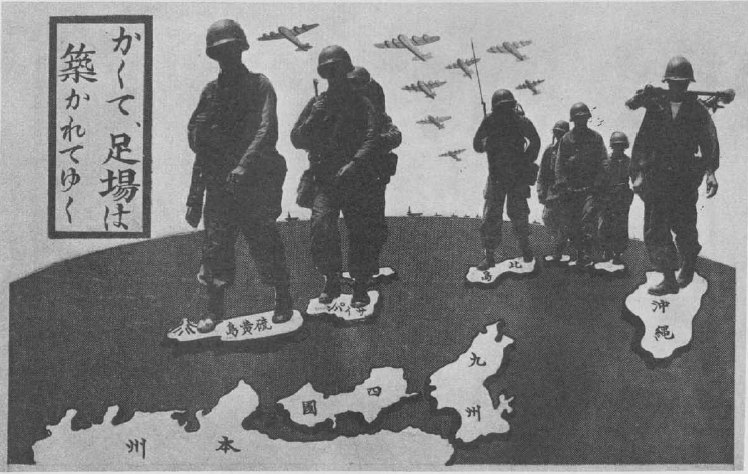
American propaganda leaflet dropped on Japan depicting the leapfrogging strategy and the increasing Allied dominance in the Pacific theatre

=== Advantages ===
Leapfrogging allowed the United States forces to reach Japan quickly and not expend the time, manpower, and supplies to capture every Japanese-held island on the way. It gave the Allies the advantage of surprise and kept the Japanese off balance, as they could not defend everywhere in strength.

=== Disadvantages ===
The bypassed Japanese forces were expected to be ineffective, to "wither on the vine" and starve within a few months, but this did not occur. They cultivated gardens using seeds and equipment imported by aircraft and submarines, worked with local labor, and remained stronger and better-organized than anticipated. They remained capable of offensive action, and mounted major counterattacks against the American forces in the Battle of Driniumor River and the Bougainville counterattack. Containing these Japanese forces tied up six American divisions, threatening to make the American Army the one that became strategically ineffective. They did not pursue defeated Japanese forces and engaged in little patrolling beyond their defensive perimeters, allowing the defeated Japanese to regroup and reform. It also left local people at the mercy of the Japanese. When MacArthur returned to the Philippines, he abandoned leapfrogging in favor of a policy of the complete destruction of the Japanese forces, mainly based on a political imperative of liberating the Filipinos. Australian forces relieved the American garrisons in late 1944 and conducted offensives against the Japanese on Bougainville and at Aitape.
