= Two-front war =

Specific manifestation of warfare

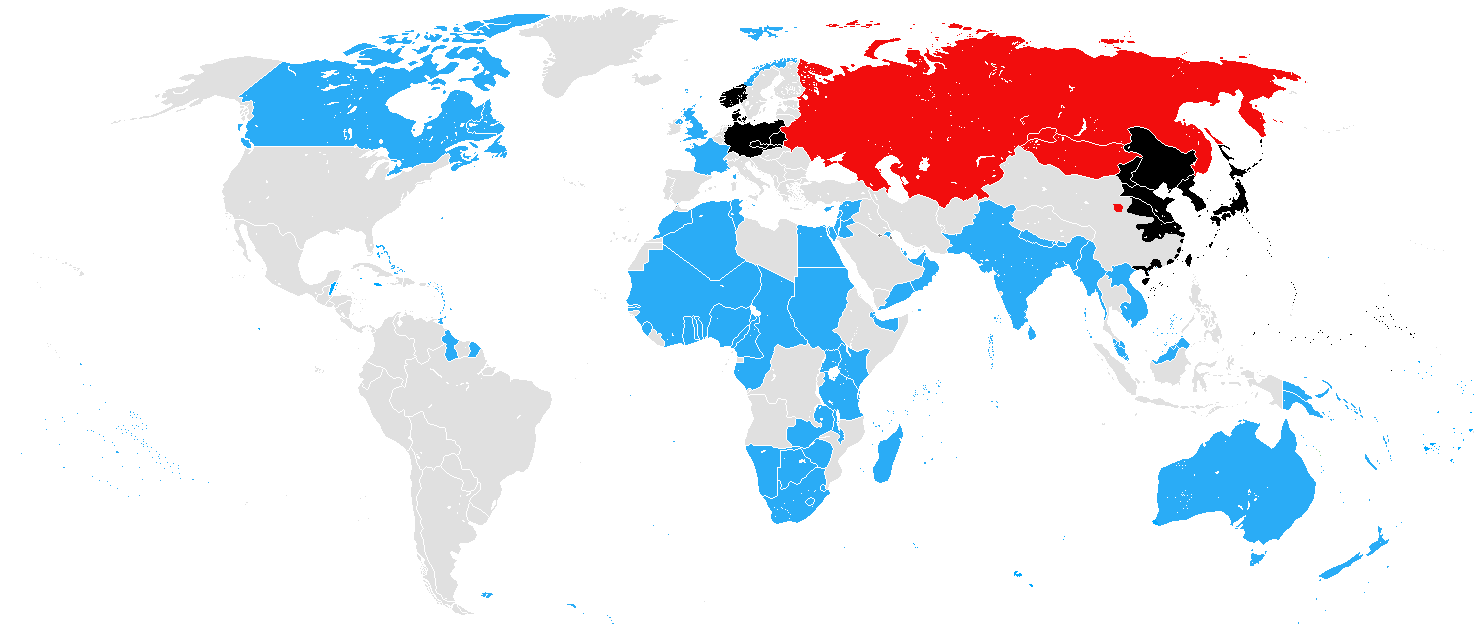
World map in May 1940, prior to the Battle of France Western Allies Axis powers Comintern The Comintern joined the Allies in June 1941 upon the beginning of Operation Barbarossa, thus confining Nazi Germany to fight a two-front war.

In military terminology, a two-front war occurs when opposing forces encounter on two geographically separate fronts. The forces of two or more allied parties usually simultaneously engage an opponent in order to increase their chances of success. The opponent consequently encounters severe logistic difficulties, as they are forced to divide and disperse their troops, defend an extended front line, and is at least partly cut off from their access to trade and exterior resources. However, by virtue of the central position, they might possess the advantages of the interior lines.

The term has widely been used in a metaphorical sense, for example to illustrate the dilemma of military commanders in the field, who struggle to carry out illusory strategic ideas of civilian bureaucrats, or when moderate legal motions or positions are concurrently opposed by the political Left and Right. Disapproval and opposition by the domestic anti-war movement and civil rights groups as opposed to the bloody military struggle of the late Vietnam War has also been described as a two-front war for the US troops, who fought in Vietnam.

== Wars in antiquity ==
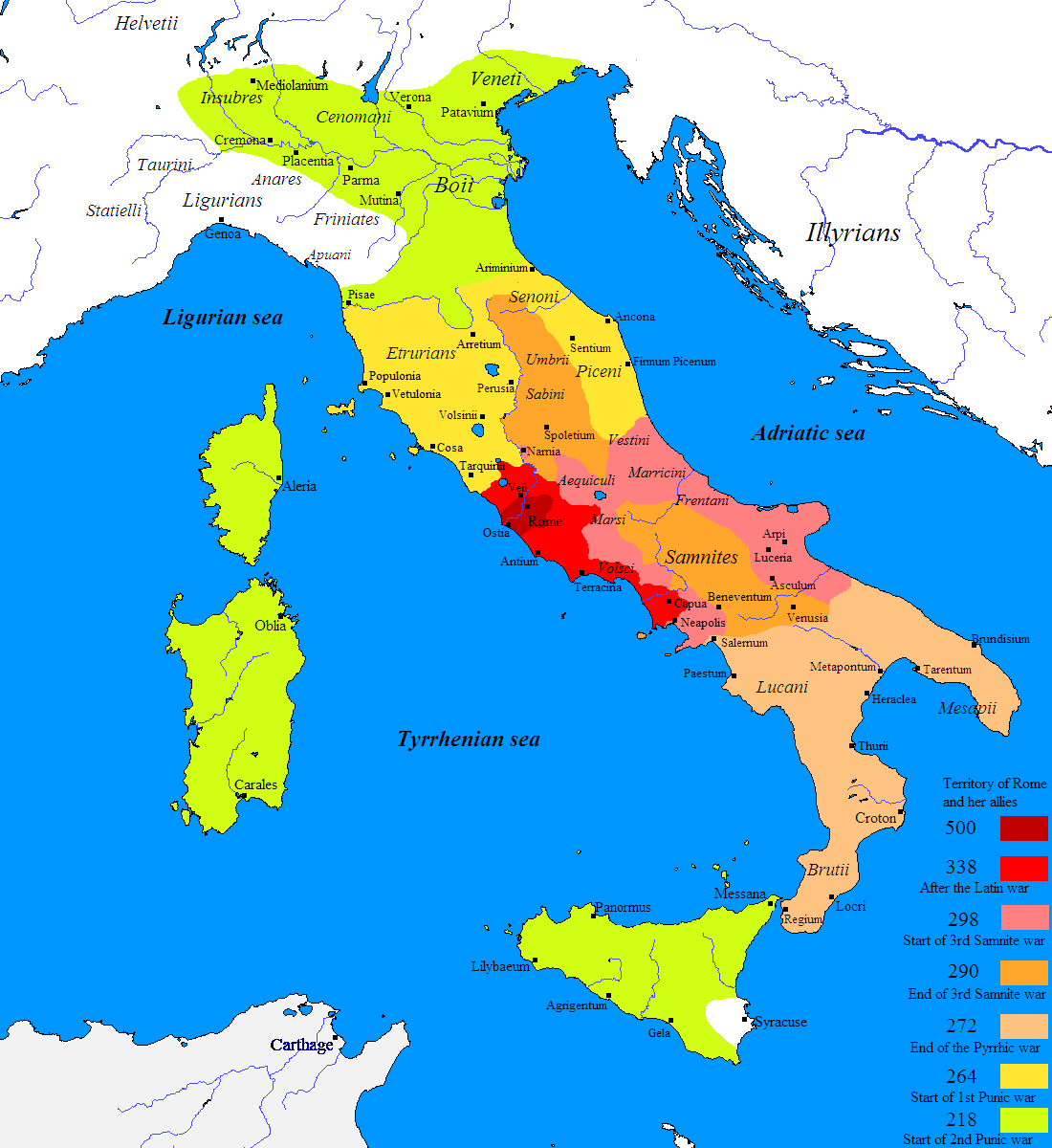
Roman expansion in Italy from 500 BC to 218 BC through the Latin War (light red), Samnite Wars (pink/orange), Pyrrhic War (beige), and First and Second Punic War (yellow and green). Cisalpine Gaul (238–146 BC) and Alpine valleys (16–7 BC) were later added. The Roman Republic in 500 BC is marked with dark red. As it ascended to supremacy in Italy, Roman Republic routinely fought on multiple fronts.

During the 5th-century BCE First Peloponnesian War the Greek polis of Athens had been embroiled in a drawn out struggle with the poleis of Aegina and Corinth among others and its primary enemy Sparta. Aware of the dangers of a battle with the superior Spartans, Athens concentrated on the conquest of Boeotia and thus avoid a prolonged two-front war.

On several occasions during the third century BCE, the Roman Republic engaged in two-front conflicts while clashing with the Gauls and Etruscans to the north and also campaigning in Magna Graecia (the coastal areas of Southern Italy). When Rome was enmeshed in the Second Punic War against Carthage, Hannibal, formal ally of the Sicilian city of Syracuse, intrigued with Philip V of Macedon in 215 BCE, who promptly declared war on Rome. After the establishment of the Roman Empire and the consolidation of its frontiers under Augustus, the Roman legions regularly battled multiple enemies, most notably Germanic tribes on the Rhine and the lower Danube and the Parthian Empire in Syria and Mesopotamia. Various emperors, such as Septimius Severus and Aurelian forcibly led large armies to the opposite ends of the empire in order to deal with the various threats. Beginning in the third century the Roman - and its eastern successor the Byzantine Empire, trying to preserve its territories in Italy, struggled with the Sassanid Empire to the east for a period of more than 400 years. Large-scale incursions of Germanic tribes, such as the Goths and Hunnic raids in the west began during the fourth century and lasted for more than a hundred years.

== Napoleonic Wars ==
During the Napoleonic Wars, the Grande Armée of France regularly maintained multiple fronts. In the seven year long Peninsular War (1807–1814) imperial French contingents and Spanish and Anglo-Portuguese armies wrestled for control of the Iberian Peninsula in numerous battles. Nonetheless, in 1812 as French military presence in Iberia had begun to decline, emperor Napoleon Bonaparte personally lead an army of more than 600.000 troops to the east into Russia, seeking to decisively defeat the Russian Empire and force Tsar Alexander I to comply with the Continental System. Great Britain was also present on multiple fronts of the Napoleonic Wars in Europe and the Canadian, the Chesapeake Bay and Louisiana theaters of the War of 1812 in North America.

== World War I ==
=== Germany ===
Europe in 1914, prior to World War I, Germany and Austria-Hungary (Italy joins the Allies in May 1915) in a two-front war scenario, are politically isolated, can effectively be cut off from marine trade, while facing Triple Entente frontlines to the East and West.

During World War I, Germany fought a two-front war against France, Great Britain, Italy, Belgium and later also American forces on the Western Front and Russia and later Romania on the Eastern Front. Russian participation in the war ended with the 1917 Bolshevik October Coup and the peace treaty with Germany and Austria-Hungary was signed in March 1918.

Its central location in Europe and (currently) borders with nine neighboring nations fundamentally define Germany's politics and strategy. Bismarck successfully integrated Germany in his elaborate system of alliance of the European powers from 1871 until he was dismissed in 1890 by the new Emperor Wilhelm II. Wilhelm embarked on an imperialist great power political course, neglected the alliances and his irrational expansion of the Imperial Navy triggered an arms race and seriously damaged the relations with France and Great Britain. By 1907, France had established an alliance with Great Britain and Russia. The German Empire found itself encircled and isolated.

German military strategists had to adapt to the new strategic situation and developed the Schlieffen Plan. A series of military operations, that were to counteract being surrounded and, if exacted ruthlessly, will lead to victory. Under the Schlieffen Plan, German forces would invade France via Belgium, Luxembourg, and the Netherlands (the idea to go through the Netherlands was abandoned because of its neutrality), quickly capturing Paris and forcing France to sue for peace. The Germans would then turn their attention to the East before the Russian army could mobilize its massive forces. The Germans failed to achieve the plan's objectives.

=== Austria ===
In 1866, the Austro-Hungarian Army was left with no other option but to divide its armed forces and disperse them on two fronts during the Austro-Prussian War against Prussia to the North and the Kingdom of Italy to the South in the Third Italian War of Independence. The Prusso-Italian alliance was agreed upon an initiative of the Prussian Minister President Otto von Bismarck.

In 1914, Austria-Hungary commenced the First World War by attacking Serbia at the Balkan front. After just a few weeks, Austria-Hungarian troops clashed with the numerically far superior Russian imperial army in the Battle of Galicia at the Eastern front. When Italy joined the conflict in May 1915 on the Allied side and deployed in strength at the Alpine front to the south, Austria-Hungary was already critically undermanned and faced serious recruitment shortfalls, which diminished the chances to exact an early defeat on any of the opponents, instead be confined to struggle in a two-front war at the periphery of its own territory. Consequently, the Austro-Hungarian Army lacked the initiative and the contributions at the Macedonian front (Salonikifront) were marginal. Nonetheless, when Romania entered the war on the Allied side in August 1916 at the southern tip of the Eastern front, Austria-Hungary acted promptly and concluded this stage in late 1916 and occupied large areas of Romania. The greater two-front war only ended after the separate peace with Russia in March 1918, which, after all, did not forestall the collapse of the imperial army in the course of summer and autumn.

== World War II ==
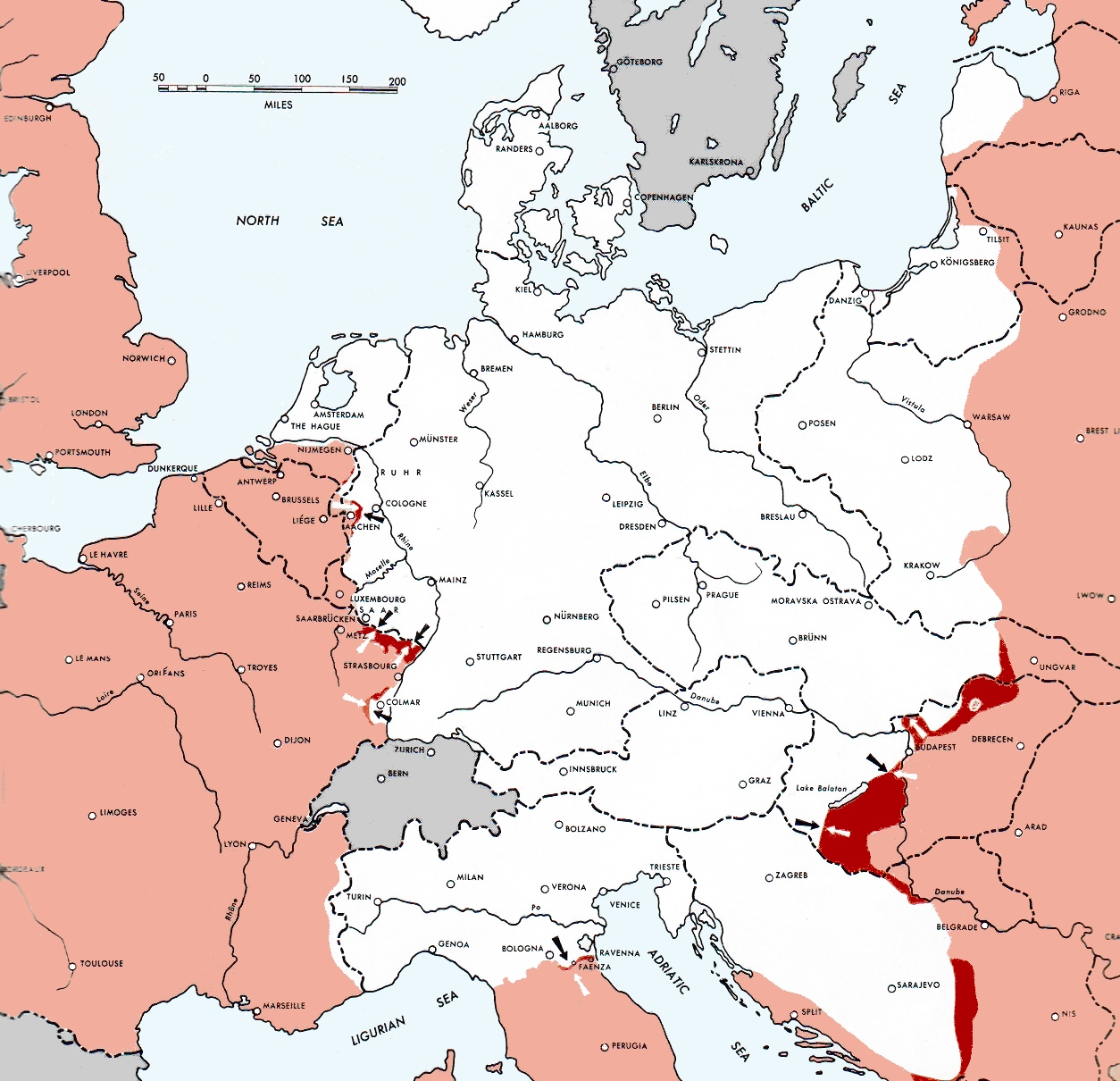
Map of remaining German-controlled territory (in white) on December 15, 1944.

A two-front war scenario, almost identical to the first World War would eventually aggregate in the European theatre during World War II, when Nazi Germany confronted allied France, Great Britain, Belgium, the Netherlands and later the United States in the west and the Soviet Union to the east.

Adolf Hitler initially attempted to avoid a two-front war as he engaged and crushed his opponents successively. In 1940, however, he failed to beat Great Britain in the air battle and in 1941, attacked the Soviet Union. Great Britain in relative safety on its island remained unbeaten and managed to maintain the western front.

Germany, that lacked the resources for a long war, failed to achieve a quick victory in the east and eventually collapsed under the pressure of a war of attrition on two fronts, accelerated by a surge of resistance and partisan groups in virtually all occupied countries. Reduced production output and dwindling replacements of casualties as a consequence of massive material warfare and Allied strategic bombing and shortages in fuel and raw materials increasingly prevented the continuation of German offensive - and Blitzkrieg tactics. In contrast, steadily improving Allied cooperative warfare, based on an exponentially growing war industry brought about the inevitable total military defeat for Germany.

The United States, who had, since December 1941, primarily focused on the conflict with the Japanese Empire, eventually established an Atlantic front in order to support their European allies, beginning in November 1942 with an amphibious landing in North Africa, later to continue the campaign in Sicily and on the Italian peninsula and invade France on the beaches of Normandy in 1944. Their colossal military strength and favorable strategic position in between two oceans without territorial borders to any of the Axis powers allowed the US forces to safely wage an offensive two-front war by maintaining the initiative in the Pacific War, contain and defeat Japan and also increase American presence in Europe that ensures Allied victory over Nazi Germany.

The Axis powers had the opportunity to force the Soviet Union into a two-front war by means of a Japanese attack in the Soviet Far East, but Japan decided against it as it had been defeated in the Soviet–Japanese border conflicts. The Soviet Union and Japan refrained from mutual hostilities until the 9 August 1945, three months after the surrender of Germany. Thus, Japan fought a two-front war in China in the Second Sino-Japanese War and against the United States in the Pacific Theatre. The Soviet Union worsened the Japanese position by invading Manchuria.

Poland fought a two front war with Germany and Russia during WWII.

== Cold War ==
A major rationale for the American 600-ship Navy plan in the 1980s was to threaten the Soviet Union with a two-front war, in Europe and the Pacific Ocean, in the event of hostilities.

=== Arab–Israeli wars ===
In the 1948 Arab–Israeli War, the Israelis fought the Egyptians to the south and the Jordanians and Syrians in the east and the north. Israel again fought two-front wars in the Six-Day War of 1967 and the Yom Kippur War of 1973.

== Conflicts of the 21st century ==
=== India, Pakistan and China ===
India's relations with Pakistan and China have for many decades been uneasy and, in fact, greatly disturbed by unsettled border feuds. The discord with Pakistan is by far the more complicated one, because both parties claim exclusive sovereignty over an entire historic region, the princely state of Jammu and Kashmir. Although matters were settled and signed in 1972, armed forces face each other, entrenched on both sides of the volatile border, the Line of Control. Attempts to directly or indirectly wrest territory from each other has hardly been successful and always caused fierce reactions.

India and China have, despite more than a dozen rounds of border talks and the uneasy Line of Actual Control, as yet failed to negotiate a conclusive agreement. For decades, the Indian press and media have pointed at political tensions and deteriorating relations with China, caused, among other things, by occasional Chinese military incursions into Indian-controlled territory.

In 2013, the China–Pakistan Economic Corridor (CPEC), a series of high-profile infrastructure development projects in Pakistan was established. Chinese-Pakistani cooperation proved to be a success and a modern infrastructure had emerged within six years and by 2019, focus has shifted to the next phase. CPEC has disclosed its programs for concrete economic development and employment creation.

The Government of India has professed security concerns and repeatedly expressed its disapproval of the CPEC project, as a number of the projects come about on territory claimed by India.

According to an Indian army general in 2018, war on multiple fronts was "very much in the realm of reality", as the consequence of ideas of isolation and concerns about the clandestine strategic commitment of China and Pakistan, as the Congress in Beijing has provided assistance to Pakistan's nuclear weapon and missile programmes.

=== Israel–Gaza war and Israel–Hezbollah conflict ===
During the Gaza war and Israel–Hezbollah conflict, the potential for Israel to invade Southern Lebanon raised the possibility of a two-front war, with some claiming the situation already is one. Prime Minister of Israel Benjamin Netanyahu has claimed that Israel can fight a two-front war, saying "We can fight on several fronts. We are prepared for this." As of September 2024, the IDF has not achieved Netanyahu's aims in Gaza, being to destroy Hamas and to liberate the hostages, and the war in Gaza is ongoing. Despite this, the invasion of Southern Lebanon looks increasingly more likely, with the Security Cabinet having approved an additional war aim of returning residents to the north of Israel, and massive waves of explosions of various electronic devices occurring across Lebanon and some parts of Syria, targeting Hezbollah members. This is widely understood to be Israeli sabotage, with unnamed sources confirming this to Axios, although Israel has not officially confirmed they are responsible.

These explosion waves have been theorized as being a decapitation strike, taking out Hezbollah members and leaders in preparation for an invasion, although it may also function as a "final warning" for Hezbollah to stop rocket strikes into Israel, or simply a psychological weapon to make Hezbollah feel unsafe wherever they are and of being fully infiltrated by Israeli intelligence services.

Israel invaded Lebanon on 1 October 2024. A 60-day ceasefire agreement was agreed on 27 November 2024, although both sides have violated the terms of the ceasefire.
