= War Plan Black =

U.S. plan to fight Germany in the early 20th century

One of the United States color-coded war plans, War Plan Black was the name of an American military plan to fight Germany in the early 20th century. The best-known version was conceived in 1910 as a plan to gain control over German colonies in the Pacific and later modified as a contingency plan during World War I in case France fell and the Germans attempted to seize French possessions in the Caribbean or to launch an attack on the eastern seaboard. The United States was to plant mines and have submarines on patrol at sites Germany might seize for a foothold in the Caribbean. The plan was revised in 1916 to concentrate the main US naval fleet in New England, and from there defend the US from the German navy. Following Germany's defeat, the plan lost importance.

== See also ==
- Imperial German plans for the invasion of the United States
- Plans for North America
