= War Plan Orange =

US war plan against the Empire of Japan

War Plan Orange (commonly known as Plan Orange or just Orange) was a series of United States Joint Army and Navy Board war plans for dealing with a possible war with Imperial Japan in the years between the First and Second World Wars. It failed to foresee the significance of technological changes in naval warfare, including the submarine, air support and aircraft carriers, and although the Battle of Midway was important, and the US Navy did "island-hop" to regain lost territory, there was no culminating "showdown" battle as anticipated by Plan Orange.

== Development ==
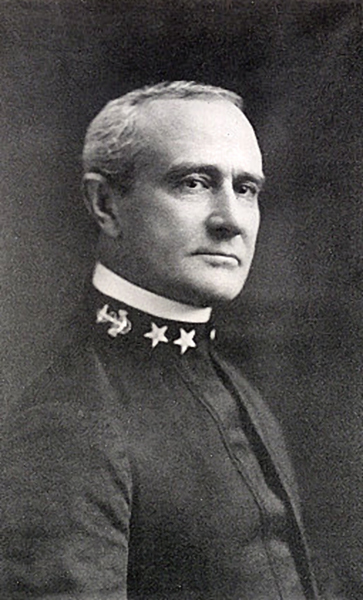
Raymond P. Rodgers, circa 1911.

Informal studies as early as 1906 covered a number of possibilities, from basing at Gibraltar or Singapore, an idea revived by the British before World War II, to "a quick trans-Atlantic dash" to the Pacific. The plan eventually adopted was conceived by Rear Admiral Raymond P. Rodgers in 1911.

- 19 Dec 1919: Strategy of the Pacific (JB 325, Serial 28)
- 7 Jul 1923: Estimate of the Situation, Orange (JB 325, Serial 207)
- 15 Aug 1924: Joint Basic War Plan - Orange (JB 325, Serial 228)
- 10 Jan 1929: Revision of Joint Army and Navy Basic War Plan Orange (JB 325, Serial 280)
- 20 Jun 1934: Inadequacy of Present Military and Naval Forces Philippine Area to Carry Out Assigned Missions in Event of an ORANGE War (JB 325, Serial 533)
- 8 May 1935: Revision of Joint Army and Navy Basic War Plan - Orange (JB 325, Serial 546)
- 19 May 1935: Revision of Joint Army and Navy Basic War Plan - Orange (JB 325, Serial 570)
- 14 Oct 1936: Revision of Joint Orange Estimate of the Situation (JB 325, Serial 589)
- 9 Dec 1936: Changes in Joint Basic War Plan Orange (JB 325, Serial 594)
- 19 Feb 1938: Joint Army and Navy Basic War Plan Orange (1938) (JB 325, Serials 617 & 618)

The plan was formally adopted by the Joint Army and Navy Board beginning in 1924. Predating the Rainbow plans, which presumed the assistance of allies, Orange assumed that the United States would fight Japan alone.

== Strategy ==
As originally conceived, it anticipated a blockade of the Philippines and other U.S. outposts in the western Pacific. They were expected to hold out on their own, while the Pacific Fleet marshaled its strength at bases in California and Hawaii and guarded against attacks on the Panama Canal.

After mobilization (the ships maintained only half of their crews in peacetime), the fleet would sail to the western Pacific to relieve American forces in Guam and the Philippines. Afterwards, the fleet would sail north for a decisive battle against the Imperial Japanese Navy's Combined Fleet, and then blockade the Japanese home islands.

The strategy was in keeping with the theory of Alfred Thayer Mahan, a doctrine to which every major navy subscribed before World War II, in which wars would be decided by engagements between opposing surface fleets, as they had been for over 300 years.

Following the 1933 Operations IV Wargame, which resulted in defeat for a hypothetical blue fleet meant to symbolize a US Philippine relief force, War Plan Orange was revised to account for a more steady, methodical advance in order to take Japanese strongpoints in the Marshall Islands. This was done in accordance to observations that both stretched logistical capacity in the "through ticket to the Philippines" strategy, and inability to repair damaged vessels, allowed Japan to gain command of the sea via the neutralization of the US battle line force.

The game carried two implications, both of them fatal to the "thrusting" concept. First, it showed that underwater damage would likely trump whatever the fleet could do in the western Pacific at the outset of a war. Ships would almost inevitably be torpedoed, and they would have to go somewhere other than the Philippines for repairs. If enough of them had to be repaired at a rear base, the fleet would no longer be superior to Orange's. Given the agreements barring fortification of Far Eastern bases, only Pearl Harbor could repair U.S capital ships. Sending them back to Hawaii would forfeit the Far East to the Japanese.

— Norman Friedman, Winning a Future War: War Gaming and Victory in the Pacific War

Despite this, the strategy followed by the U.S. in the Pacific War differed little from Rodgers' concept from 1911: a leapfrog campaign to conquer the Marshalls and Carolines (held by Japan before the war), liberation of the Philippines, and blockade. Absent was the "decisive battle" of Mahan, and of Japanese planning.

== Japanese plans ==
In accordance with the Kantai Kessen naval strategy, the Imperial Japanese Navy developed its own plan, that allowed the US Pacific Fleet to sail across the Pacific while the IJN would use submarines and carrier attacks to weaken it. The Japanese fleet would then attempt to force a fleet action against the weakened US fleet in a "decisive battle area", near Japan, also in line with Mahanian doctrine, which Japan had enthusiastically embraced.

It was the basis for Japan's demand for a 70% ratio (10:10:7) at the Washington Naval Conference, which was considered necessary to provide Japan superiority in the "decisive battle area", taking into account that the US had naval commitments in other theaters, while Japan did not. It was also the basis of the United States' insistence on 60%, which amounted to parity.

== Outcomes ==
Actual events generally followed the plan. Although carrier battles and the use of airplanes and submarines overshadowed surface action, the "leapfrog" campaign played out largely as anticipated.

The Imperial Japanese Navy, obsessed with the "decisive battle" doctrine, ignored the vital need for defense against submarines. The German and American submarine campaigns against their opponents' merchant shipping demonstrated the need for an anti-submarine warfare strategy. While the Allies took extensive measures to combat the threat of German U-boats, the Japanese failed to effectively counter the American submarines, which ultimately choked Japan's industrial production and paralyzed her navy.

Japan also notably failed to institute an anti-commerce campaign where systematic use of commerce raiders could have made Allied operations much more complex and conquering and holding Japanese-held islands more difficult.

American war planners failed to appreciate that technological advances in submarines and naval aviation had made Mahan's doctrine obsolete and did not anticipate a preemptive strike from the Japanese. In particular, they did not yet know either that aircraft would be able to effectively sink battleships, or that Japan might put the American battleship force (the Battle Line) out of action at a stroke, which actually happened at Pearl Harbor on December 7, 1941.

American plans changed after this attack. Even after major Japanese defeats like Midway, once the effectiveness of aircraft carriers was known, the Americans favored a methodical "island-hopping" advance, never going far beyond land-based air cover. Meanwhile, a blockade was imposed from the very beginning of the war, with the first American submarine, USS Gudgeon, arriving off Japan on about 31 December 1941.

A number of requirements grew out of Orange, including the specification for a fleet submarine with high speed, long range, and heavy torpedo armament. These coalesced in the submarine Dolphin in 1932. In August 1941, this was rejected and the US returned to the Gato class. The demand for submarines of this size also drove the development of the notoriously problematic Mark 14 torpedo, and its equally notorious Mark VI exploder, under the guidance of Commander Ralph W. Christie. The Navy also spent "several hundred thousand dollars" to develop powerful, compact diesel engines, among them the troublesome Hooven-Owens-Rentschler, which proved useful for railroads.

== See also ==
- How Japan Plans to Win by Kinoaki Matsuo (1942)
- Plan Dog memo
- Singapore Strategy
- Operation Causeway
- Operation Downfall
