= Franklin D. Roosevelt's cabinet =

Franklin D. Roosevelt served four terms as President of the United States. Franklin D. Roosevelt's cabinet may refer to:

- 1st and 2nd terms
- 3rd and 4th terms
