= George Crocker =

George Crocker may refer to:

- George Crocker (businessman) (1856–1909), American heir and businessman
- George A. Crocker (born 1943), U.S. Army Lieutenant General
- George N. Crocker (1906–1970), U.S. Army officer, author, lawyer and businessman
- George G. Crocker (fl. 1843–1892), Massachusetts lawyer and politician
