= George N. Crocker =

American lawyer

- Born: July 31, 1906; California
- Died: February 20, 1970 (aged 63); San Francisco, CA
- Citizenship: American
- Writing career
- Language: English
- Notable work: Roosevelt's Road to Russia (1959)

George N. Crocker (July 31, 1906 – February 20, 1970) was a United States Army officer, writer, lawyer, and businessman.

== Biography ==
Crocker served as Dean of Golden Gate University School of Law from 1934 to 1941 when he resigned. Crocker was one of several critics of the New Deal and of Franklin D. Roosevelt's foreign policy. During World War II, Crocker was an officer in the largest and longest Army court-martial resulting from the Fort Lawton Riot.

Crocker's Roosevelt's Road to Russia was published by Henry Regnery Company (1959). Generally ignored by the New York/Washington establishment, it garnered favorable reviews in the National Review, Modern Age, The Chicago Tribune, and The Boston Herald. The Council on Foreign Relations’ foreign policy journal Foreign Affairs described the book as a “blisteringly critical but generally familiar review of F.D.R.'s wartime foreign policy.”

Crocker made claims that Roosevelt invariably backed Stalin and went to great lengths to hide his position from the American public.

Crocker was also highly critical of Roosevelt's 1940 Republican opponent, Wendell Willkie, a former Democrat. After Willkie's defeat, Crocker wrote:

The flighty Wendell Willkie ... suddenly 'got religion' and became an ebullient emissary for Roosevelt, traveling to London, Moscow, and Chungking in an Army transport plane, emotionally overcome by his precipitate arrival in the upper regions of international fame. His much publicized slogan 'One World', served well to cover up the real state of affairs. ... Whether other Republican leaders, such as Hoover and Taft, and dissident Democrats ... looked upon these antics of Wendell Willkie as those of an opportunistic hypocrite or an impressionable dupe, we know not. They [Hoover and Taft] themselves had no hallucinations about a 'grand coalition of peoples, fighting a common war of liberation.'

== Works ==
- Roosevelt's Road to Russia (Henry Regnery Company, 1959) (PDF)
