= Presidency of Franklin D. Roosevelt (1941–1945) =

U.S. presidential administration from 1941 to 1945

- Roosevelt in 1944
- Presidency of Franklin D. Roosevelt; March 4, 1933 – April 12, 1945
- Cabinet: See list
- Party: Democratic
- Seat: White House
- Third term January 20, 1941 – January 20, 1945
- Vice President: Henry A. Wallace
- Election: 1940
- Fourth term January 20, 1945 – April 12, 1945
- Vice President: Harry S. Truman
- Election: 1944
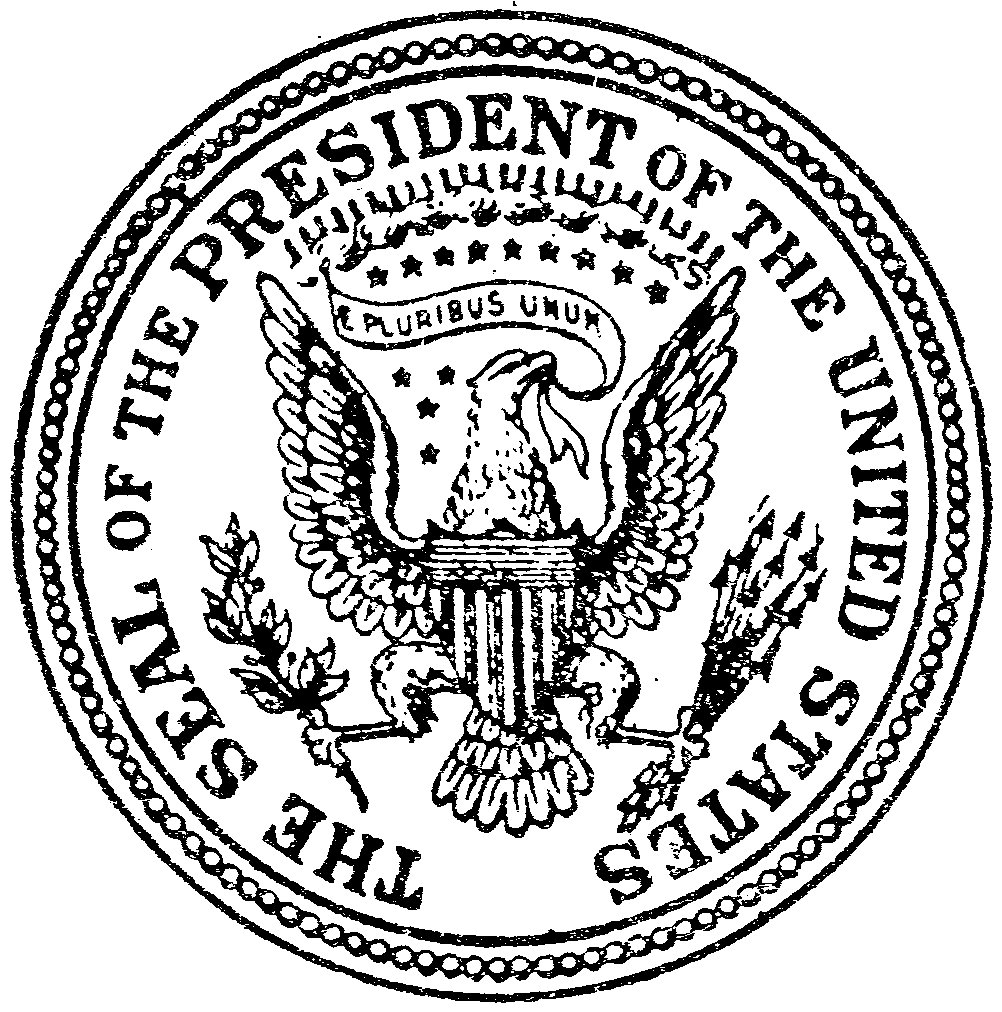
- Seal of the president (1894–1945)

The third presidential term of Franklin D. Roosevelt began on January 20, 1941, when he was once again inaugurated as the 32nd president of the United States, and the fourth term of his presidency ended with his death on April 12, 1945. Roosevelt won a third term by defeating Republican nominee Wendell Willkie in the 1940 presidential election. He remains the only president to serve for more than two terms. Unlike his first two terms, Roosevelt's third and fourth terms were dominated by foreign policy concerns, as the United States became involved in World War II in December 1941.

Roosevelt won congressional approval of the Lend-Lease program, which was designed to aid the United Kingdom in its war against Nazi Germany, while the U.S. remained officially neutral. After Germany began war against the Soviet Union in June 1941, Roosevelt extended Lend-Lease to the Soviet Union as well. In Asia, Roosevelt provided aid to the Republic of China, which was resisting an invasion by the Empire of Japan. In response to the July 1941 Japanese occupation of French Indochina, Roosevelt expanded a trade embargo to cut off oil that Japan urgently needed for its fleet. When Roosevelt refused to end the embargo, on December 7, 1941, Japan launched an attack on the U.S. fleet stationed at Pearl Harbor in Hawaii. Isolationist sentiment in the U.S. immediately collapsed and Congress declared war on Japan. After Germany declared war on the U.S., Congress declared war on Germany and Italy. To win the war, the U.S., Britain and the Soviet Union assembled a large coalition of the Allies. The U.S. funded much of the war efforts of the other allies, and supplied munitions, food, and oil. In consultation with his Army and Navy and British prime minister Winston Churchill, Roosevelt decided on a Europe first strategy, which focused on defeating Germany before Japan. In practice, however, in 1942 and 1943 the U.S. focused on fighting Japan.

In late 1942, the U.S. began its ground campaign against Germany with an invasion of North Africa. The German and Italian forces surrendered in May 1943, opening the way for the invasions of Sicily and Italy. Meanwhile, the U.S. Navy won a decisive victory over Japan in the Battle of Midway and began a campaign of island hopping in the Pacific. In 1943, the Allies launched an invasion of Italy and continued to pursue the island hopping strategy. The top Allied leaders met at the Tehran Conference in 1943, where they began to discuss post-war plans. Among the concepts discussed was the United Nations, an intergovernmental organization championed by Roosevelt that would replace the League of Nations after the war. In 1944, the Allies launched a successful invasion of northern France and the US Navy won a decisive naval victory over Japan in the Battle of Leyte Gulf. By the time of Roosevelt's death in April 1945, the Allies had occupied portions of Germany and the US was in the process of capturing Okinawa. Germany and Japan surrendered in May–August 1945 during the administration of Roosevelt's successor Harry S. Truman, who previously served as Roosevelt's vice president.

Though foreign affairs dominated Roosevelt's third and fourth terms, important developments also took place on the home front. The military buildup spurred economic growth, and unemployment fell precipitously. The United States excelled at war production; in 1944, it produced more military aircraft than the combined output of Germany, Japan, Britain, and the Soviet Union. The United States also established the Manhattan Project to produce the world's first nuclear weapons. As in Roosevelt's second term, the conservative coalition prevented Roosevelt from passing major domestic legislation, though it did increase taxes to help pay for the war. Congress also passed the G.I. Bill, which provided several benefits to World War II veterans. Roosevelt avoided imposing heavy-handed censorship or harsh crackdowns on war-time dissent, but his administration relocated and interned approximately 120,000 Japanese Americans. Roosevelt also prohibited religious and racial discrimination in the defense industry and established the Fair Employment Practice Committee, the first national program designed to prevent employment discrimination. Scholars, historians, and the public typically rank Roosevelt alongside Abraham Lincoln and George Washington as one of the three greatest U.S. presidents.

== 1940 election ==
President Roosevelt defeated Republican Wendell Willkie in the 1940 presidential election.

The two-term tradition had been an unwritten rule (until the ratification of the 22nd Amendment after Roosevelt's presidency) since George Washington declined to run for a third term in 1796. Both Ulysses S. Grant and Theodore Roosevelt were attacked for trying to obtain a third non-consecutive term. Roosevelt systematically undercut prominent Democrats who were angling for the nomination, including Vice President John Nance Garner and two cabinet members, Secretary of State Cordell Hull and Postmaster General James Farley. Roosevelt moved the convention to Chicago where he had strong support from the city machine, which controlled the auditorium sound system. At the convention the opposition was poorly organized, but Farley had packed the galleries. Roosevelt sent a message saying that he would not run unless he was drafted, and that the delegates were free to vote for anyone. The delegates were stunned; then the loudspeaker screamed "We want Roosevelt... The world wants Roosevelt!" The delegates went wild and he was nominated by 946 to 147 on the first ballot. The tactic employed by Roosevelt was not entirely successful, as his goal had been to be drafted by acclamation. At Roosevelt's request, the convention nominated Secretary of Agriculture Henry Wallace for vice president. Democratic party leaders disliked Wallace, a former Republican who strongly supported the New Deal, but were unable to prevent his nomination.

World War II shook up the Republican field, possibly preventing the nomination of isolationist congressional leaders like Taft or Vandenberg. The 1940 Republican National Convention instead nominated Wendell Willkie, who had never held public office. A well-known corporate attorney and executive, Willkie rose to public notice through his criticism of the New Deal and his clashes with the TVA. Unlike his isolationist rivals for the Republican nomination, Willkie favored Britain in the war, and he was backed by internationalist Republicans like Henry Luce the publisher of influential magazines like TIME. Willkie's internationalist views initially prevented disputes over foreign policy from dominating the campaign, helping to allow for the Destroyers-for-bases deal and the establishment of a peacetime draft.

FDR was in a fighting mood, as he called out to an enthusiastic audience in Brooklyn:

I am only fighting for a free America – for a country in which all men and women have equal rights to liberty and justice. I'm fighting against the revival of government by special privilege....I am fighting, as I always have fought, for the rights of the little man as well as the big man....I'm fighting to keep this nation prosperous and at peace. I'm fighting to keep our people out of foreign wars, and to keep foreign conceptions of government out of our own United States. I'm fighting for these great and good causes.

As the campaign drew to a close, Willkie warned that Roosevelt's re-election would lead to the deployment of American soldiers abroad. In response, Roosevelt promised that, "Your boys are not going to be sent into any foreign wars." Roosevelt won the 1940 election with 55% of the popular vote and almost 85% of the electoral vote (449 to 82). Willkie won ten states: strongly Republican states of Vermont and Maine, and eight isolationist states in the Midwest. The Democrats retained their congressional majorities, but the conservative coalition largely controlled domestic legislation and remained "leery of presidential extensions of executive power through social programs."

=== Elections during third and fourth presidency Franklin D. Roosevelt ===
Congressional party leaders
		Senate leaders		House leaders	
Congress	Year	Majority	Minority	Speaker	Minority
73rd	1933.03.04.-–1935.01.03.	Robinson	McNary	Rainey	Snell
74th	1935.01.03.–1936.06.04.	Robinson	McNary	Byrns	Snell
74th	1936.06.04.–1937.01.03.	Robinson	McNary	Bankhead	Snell
75th	1937.01.03.–1937.07.14.	Robinson	McNary	Bankhead	Snell
75th	1937.07.14.–1937.01.03.	Barkley	McNary	Bankhead	Snell
76th	1939.01.03.–1941.01.03.	Barkley	McNary	Bankhead	Martin
77th	1941.01.03.–1943.01.03.	Barkley	McNary	Rayburn	Martin
78th	1943.01.03.–1945.01.03.	Barkley	White	Rayburn	Martin
78th	1945.01.03.–1947.01.03.	Barkley	White	Rayburn	Martin

Democratic seats in Congress
Congress	Senate	House
73rd	59	313
74th	69	322
75th	75	334
76th	69	262
77th	66	267
78th	57	222
79th	57	244

== Personnel ==
=== Executive branch ===
Roosevelt cabinet
Office	Name	Term
President	Franklin D. Roosevelt	1933–1945
Vice President	John Nance Garner	1933–1941
Henry A. Wallace	1941–1945
Harry S. Truman	1945
Secretary of State	Cordell Hull	1933–1944
Edward Stettinius Jr.	1944–1945
Secretary of the Treasury	William H. Woodin	1933
Henry Morgenthau Jr.	1934–1945
Secretary of War	George Dern	1933–1936
Harry Hines Woodring	1936–1940
Henry L. Stimson	1940–1945
Attorney General	Homer Stille Cummings	1933–1939
Frank Murphy	1939–1940
Robert H. Jackson	1940–1941
Francis Biddle	1941–1945
Postmaster General	James Farley	1933–1940
Frank C. Walker	1940–1945
Secretary of the Navy	Claude A. Swanson	1933–1939
Charles Edison	1939–1940
Frank Knox	1940–1944
James Forrestal	1944–1945
Secretary of the Interior	Harold L. Ickes	1933–1945
Secretary of Agriculture	Henry A. Wallace	1933–1940
Claude R. Wickard	1940–1945
Secretary of Commerce	Daniel C. Roper	1933–1938
Harry Hopkins	1938–1940
Jesse H. Jones	1940–1945
Henry A. Wallace	1945
Secretary of Labor	Frances Perkins	1933–1945

Roosevelt's standard strategy was to give two different people the same role, expecting controversy would result. He wanted the agencies' heads to bring the controversy to him and he would make the decision. Roosevelt on August 21, 1942, explicitly wrote all of his department heads that disagreements: "should not be publicly aired, but are to be submitted to me by the appropriate heads of the conflicting agencies." Anyone going public had to resign. By far the most famous controversy came during the war when Secretary of Commerce Jesse H. Jones and Vice President Henry A. Wallace clashed publicly over who would purchase war supplies in Latin America. Congress gave the authority to the Reconstruction Finance Corporation controlled by Jones; Roosevelt gave the power to Wallace, who envisioned creating a sort of little New Deal for poorly paid South American workers. According to James MacGregor Burns, Jones, a leader of Southern conservative Democrats, was, "taciturn, shrewd, practical, cautious.” Wallace, deeply distrusted by Democratic party leaders, was the, "hero of the Lib Labs, dreamy, utopian, even mystical yet, yet with his own bent for management and power." On July 15, 1943, days after they escalated their private controversy to Congress and the public, Roosevelt stripped both of their roles in the matter.

As World War II approached, Roosevelt brought in a new cohort of top leaders, including conservative Republicans to top Pentagon roles. Frank Knox, the 1936 Republican vice presidential nominee, became Secretary of the Navy while former Secretary of State Henry L. Stimson became Secretary of War. Roosevelt began convening a "war cabinet" consisting of Hull, Stimson, Knox, Chief of Naval Operations Harold Rainsford Stark, and Army Chief of Staff George Marshall. In 1942 Roosevelt set up a new military command structure with Admiral Ernest J. King (Stark's successor) as in complete control of the Navy and Marines. Marshall was in charge of the Army and nominally led the Air Force, which in practice was nearly independent and was commanded by General Hap Arnold. Roosevelt formed a new body, the Joint Chiefs of Staff, which made the final decisions on American military strategy. The Joint Chiefs was a White House agency and was chaired by his old friend Admiral William D. Leahy. The Joint Chiefs worked closely with their British counterparts and formed the Combined Chiefs of Staff. Unlike Stalin, Churchill and Hitler, Roosevelt rarely overrode his military advisors. His civilian appointees handled the draft and procurement of men and equipment, but no civilians – not even the secretaries of War or Navy, had a voice in strategy. Roosevelt avoided the State Department and conducted high level diplomacy through his aides, especially Harry Hopkins. Since Hopkins also controlled $40 billion in Lend-Lease funds given to the Allies, they paid attention to him. Treasury Secretary Henry Morgenthau Jr. played an increasingly central role in foreign policy, especially regarding China.

=== Judicial appointments ===
Due to the retirements of Chief Justice Charles Evans Hughes and Associate Justice James Clark McReynolds, Roosevelt filled three Supreme Court vacancies in 1941. He elevated Harlan F. Stone, a Republican appointed to the Court by Coolidge, to chief justice and then appointed two Democrats. Senator James F. Byrnes of South Carolina and Attorney General Robert H. Jackson became associate justices. The combination of the liberal Jackson, centrist Stone, and conservative Byrnes helped ensure the Senate confirmation of all three justices. Byrnes disliked serving on the Court, and he resigned to take a top position in the Roosevelt administration in 1942. Roosevelt nominated Wiley Rutledge to replace him on the court. Rutledge a liberal federal appellate judge who would serve on the Supreme Court for just seven years. By the end of 1941, Roosevelt had appointed Stone, Hugo Black, Stanley Forman Reed, Felix Frankfurter, William O. Douglas, Frank Murphy, Byrnes, Jackson, and Rutledge, making Owen Roberts the lone Supreme Court justice whom Roosevelt had not appointed to the Court or elevated to Chief Justice. Roosevelt's appointees upheld his policies, but often disagreed in other areas, especially after Roosevelt's death. William O. Douglas and Black served until the 1970s and joined or wrote many of the major decisions of the Warren Court, while Jackson and Frankfurter advocated judicial restraint and deference to elected officials.

== Prelude to war: 1941 ==
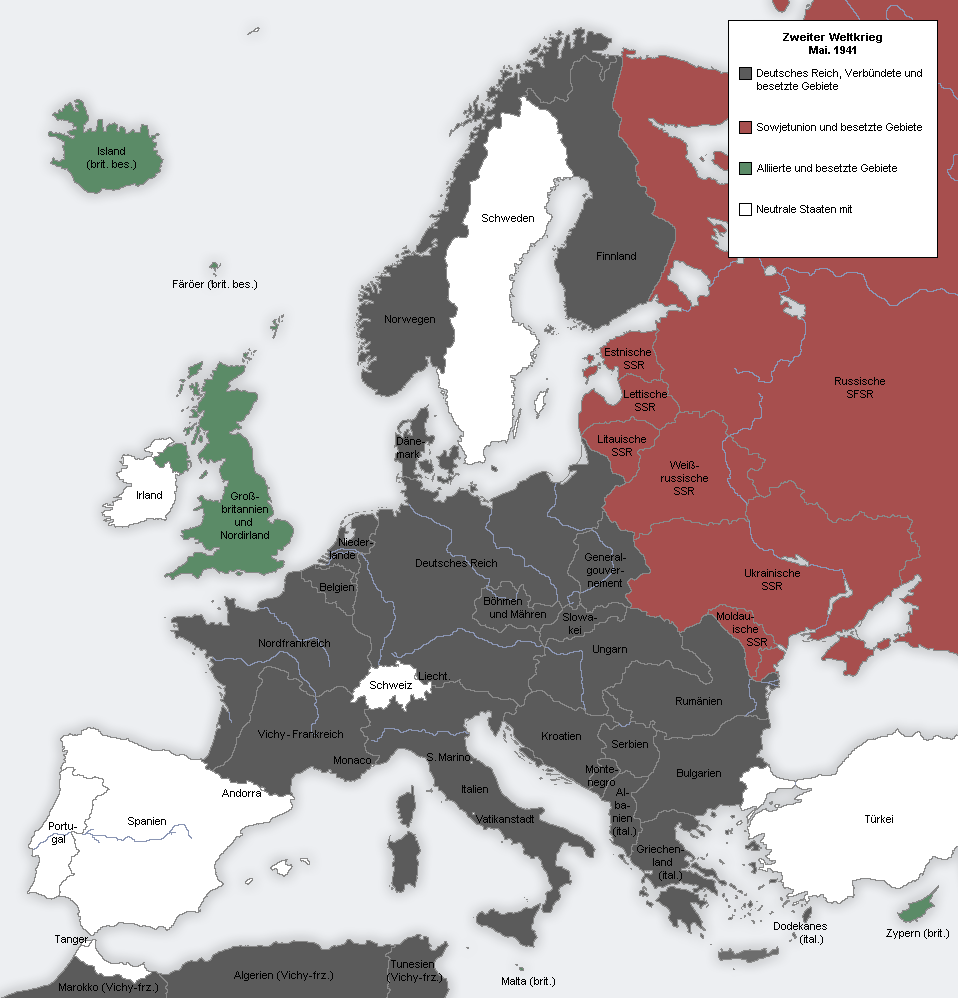
The geopolitical disposition of Europe in 1941. The grey area represents Nazi Germany, its allies, and countries under its firm control.

=== Britain and Germany 1941 ===
After his victory in the 1940 election, Roosevelt embarked on a public campaign to win congressional support for aid to the British. In December 1940, Roosevelt received an appeal from Churchill explaining London could not finance the “cash and carry” provision of the Neutrality Act. With British forces deeply committed to fighting Germany, Churchill asked Washington to provide loans and shipping for American goods. Roosevelt agreed and delivered a speech in which he called for the United States to serve as the "Arsenal of Democracy," supplying aid to those resisting Germany and other aggressors. He stated, "if Great Britain goes down, the Axis Powers will control the continents of Europe, Asia, Africa, Australia, and the high seas—and they will be in a position to bring enormous military and naval resources against this hemisphere."

In his January 1941 Four Freedoms speech, Roosevelt laid out the case for an American defense of basic rights throughout the world. In that same speech, Roosevelt asked Congress to approve a Lend-Lease program designed to provide military aid to Britain. The cover story was that the supplies were only being lent and would be returned after the war. With the backing of Willkie, the Lend-Lease bill passed by large majorities in both houses of Congress, with most of the opposition coming from Midwestern Republicans. Isolationists did, however, prevent the U.S. from providing naval escorts to merchant ships heading to Britain. Roosevelt also requested, and Congress granted, a massive boost in military expenditures. Military facilities, shipyards and munitions plants were built across the country (especially in the South) and the unemployment rate dropped below ten percent for the first time in over a decade. To oversee mobilization efforts, Roosevelt created the Office of Production Management, the Office of Price Administration and Civilian Supply, and the Supply Priorities and Allocations Board.

In late 1940, Admiral Stark had sent Roosevelt the Plan Dog memo, which set forth four possible strategic war plans for fighting an anticipated two-front war against Japan and Germany. Of the four strategies, Stark advocated for the so-called "Plan Dog," which contemplated a Europe first strategy and the avoidance of conflict with Japan for as long as possible. A key part of this strategy was to ensure that Britain remained in the fight against Germany until the United States, potentially with the aid of other countries, could launch a land offensive into Europe. Roosevelt did not publicly commit to Plan Dog, but it motivated him to launch talks between American and British military staff, codenamed "ABC–1." In early 1941, American and British military planners jointly agreed to pursue a Europe first strategy. In July 1941, Roosevelt ordered Secretary of War Stimson to begin planning for total American military involvement. The resulting "Victory Program" provided the army's estimates of the mobilization of manpower, industry, and logistics necessary to defeat Germany and Japan. The program planned to dramatically increase aid to the Allied nations and to prepare a force of ten million men in arms, half of whom would be ready for deployment abroad in 1943.

When Germany invaded the Soviet Union in June 1941, Roosevelt extended Lend-Lease to Moscow. Thus, Roosevelt had committed the American economy to the Allied cause with a policy of "all aid short of war." Some Americans were reluctant to aid the Soviet Union, but Roosevelt believed that the Soviets would be indispensable in the defeat of Germany. Execution of the aid fell victim to foot-dragging in the administration, so FDR appointed a special assistant, Wayne Coy, to expedite matters. The relationship with Moscow was informal—there was no treaty with the USSR.

=== Battle of the Atlantic 1941 ===
In February 1941, Hitler refocused the war against Britain from air raids to naval operations, specifically U-boat (German submarine) raids against convoys of food and munitions headed to Britain. Canada and Britain provided naval escorts but Churchill needed more and asked Roosevelt. Roosevelt said no—he was still reluctant to challenge anti-war sentiment. In May, German submarines sank the SS Robin Moor, an American freighter, but Roosevelt decided not to use the incident as a pretext to increase the navy's role in the Atlantic. Meanwhile, Germany celebrated victories against Yugoslavia, Greece, Russia, and the British forces in the Mediterranean.

In August 1941, Roosevelt and Churchill met secretly in Argentia, Newfoundland. This meeting produced the Atlantic Charter, which conceptually outlined global wartime and postwar goals. Each leader pledged to support democracy, self-determination, free trade, and principles of non-aggression. Less than a month after Roosevelt and Churchill met at Argentia, a German submarine fired on the U.S. destroyer Greer, but the torpedo missed. In response, Roosevelt announced a new policy in which the U.S. would attack German U-boats that entered U.S. naval zones. This "shoot on sight" policy effectively declared naval war on Germany and was approved by Americans in polls by a margin of 2-to-1. The Roosevelt administration also took control over Greenland and Iceland, which provided useful naval bases in the northern Atlantic Ocean.

Seeking to bolster U.S. power in the Western Hemisphere and eliminate German influence, the Roosevelt administration increased military, commercial, and cultural engagement with Latin America. Nelson Rockefeller played a major role. The FBI trained the secret police of friendly nations. German sales to military forces was displaced by American aid. Pro-German newspapers and radio stations were blacklisted. Government censorship was encouraged, while Latin America was blanketed with pro-American propaganda. Hitler did not aggressively respond to U.S. actions, as he wanted to avoid any incident that would bring the U.S. into the war prior to the defeat of the Soviet Union.

In October 1941, the USS Kearny, along with other warships, engaged a number of U-boats south of Iceland; the Kearny took fire and lost eleven crewmen. Following the attack, Congress amended the Neutrality Act to allow U.S. ships to transport material to Britain, effectively repealing the last provision of the cash and carry policy. However, neither the Kearny incident nor an attack on the USS Reuben James changed public opinion as much as Roosevelt hoped they might.

=== Tensions with Japan ===
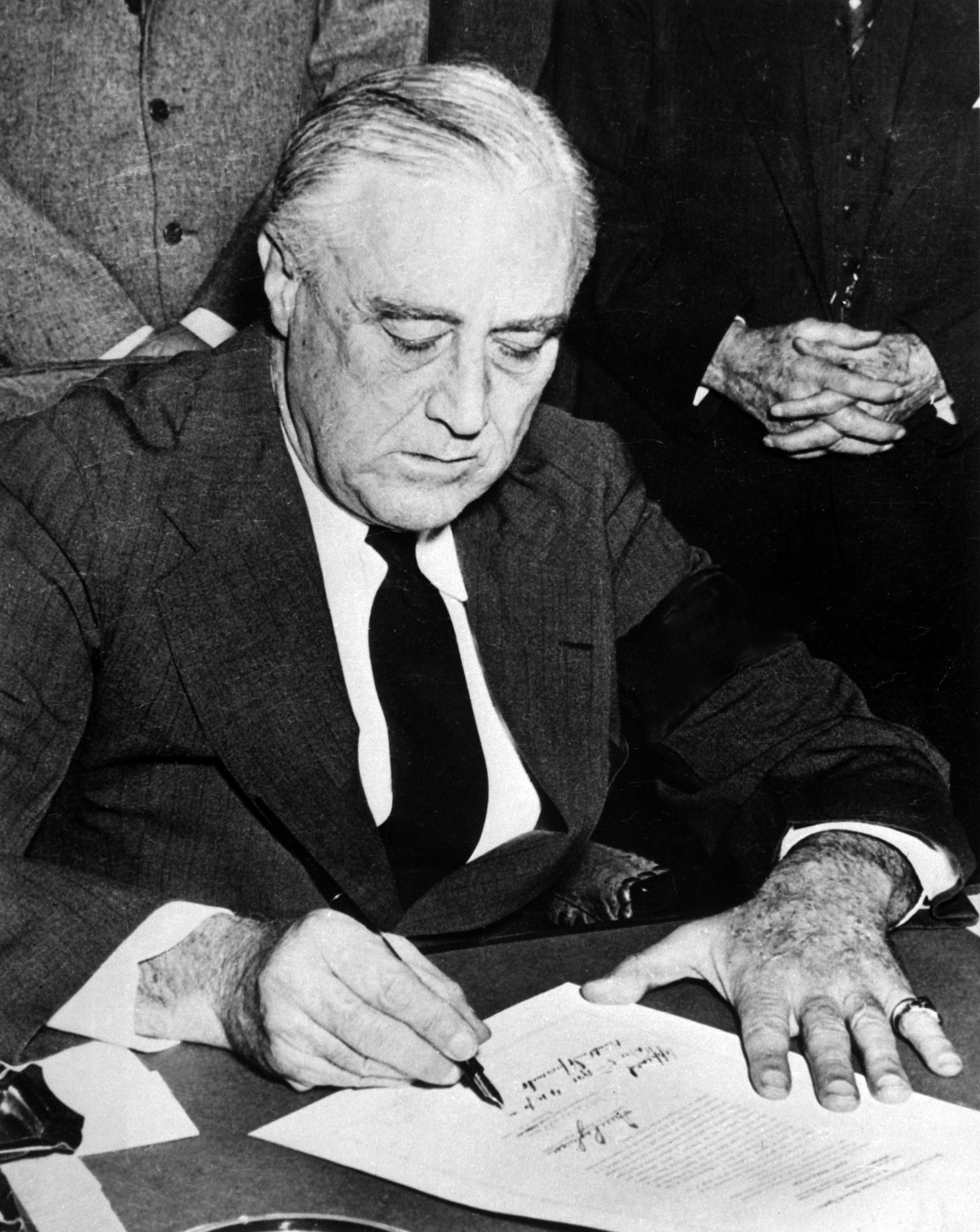
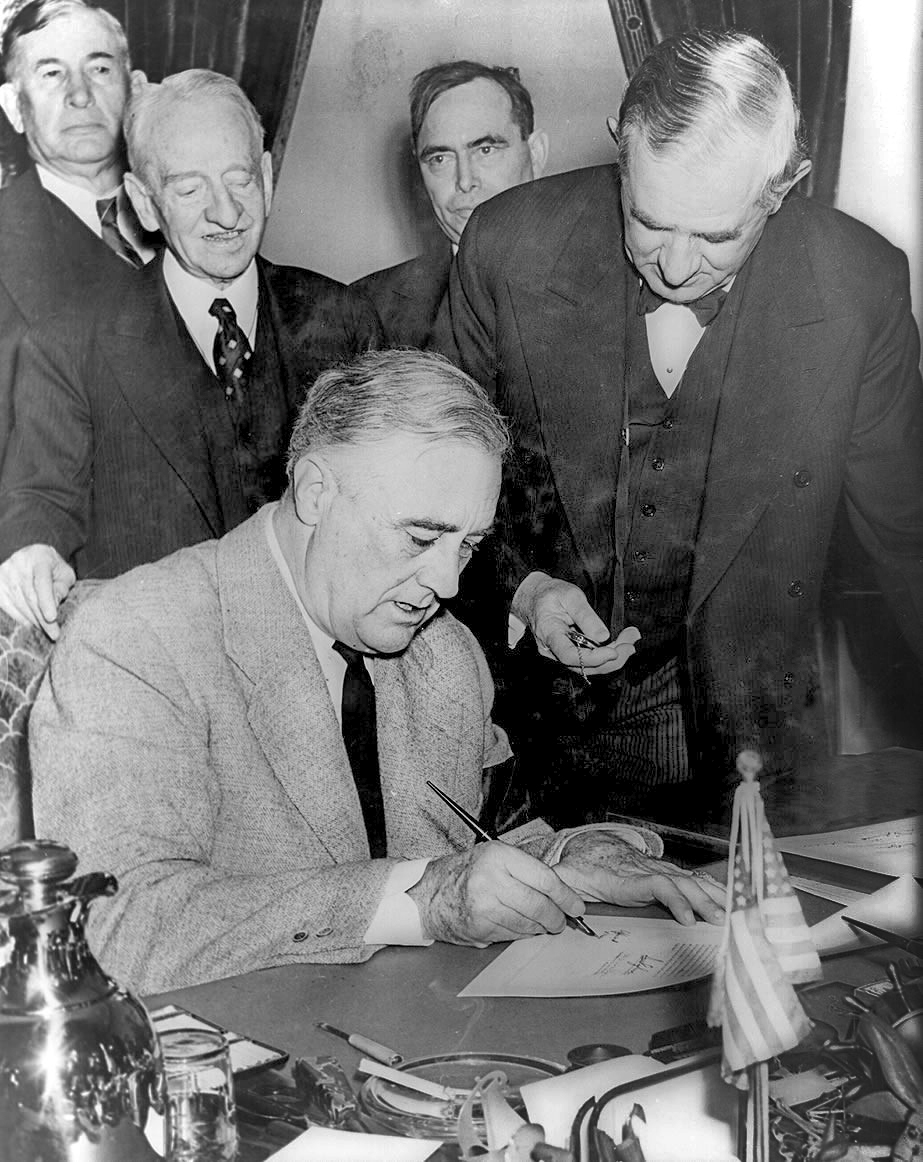
Roosevelt signing declaration of war against Japan (left) on December 8 and against Germany (right) on December 11, 1941.

By 1940, Japan had conquered much of the Chinese coast and major river valleys, but had been unable to defeat either the Nationalist government of Chiang Kai-shek or the Communist forces under Mao Zedong. Though Japan's government was nominally led by the civilian government of Prime Minister Fumimaro Konoye, Minister of War Hideki Tojo and other military leaders controlled the Japanese government. Tojo sent his military to take control of lightly defended French colonies in Indochina, which provided important resources as well as a conduit of supply to Chinese forces. When Japan occupied northern French Indochina in late 1940, Roosevelt authorized increased aid to the Republic of China, a policy that won widespread popular support. He also implemented a partial embargo on Japan, preventing the export of iron and steel. Over the next year, the Roosevelt administration debated imposing an embargo on oil, the key American export to Japan. Though some in the administration wanted to do everything possible to prevent Japanese expansion, Secretary of State Hull feared that cutting off trade would encourage the Japanese to meet its needs for natural resources through the conquest of the Dutch East Indies, British Malaya, British Burma, or the American Philippines.

With Roosevelt's attention focused on Europe, Hull took the lead in setting Asian policy and negotiating with Japan. Beginning in March 1941, Hull and Japanese ambassador Kichisaburō Nomura sought to reach an accommodation between their respective governments. As the U.S. was not willing to accept the Japanese occupation of China, and Japan was not willing to withdraw from that country, the two sides were unable to reach an agreement. After Germany launched its invasion of the Soviet Union in June 1941, the Japanese declined to attack Soviet forces in Siberia, ending a long-running internal debate over the best target for Japanese expansion. In July, Japan took control of southern French Indochina, which provided a potential staging ground for an attack on British Burma and Malaya and the Dutch East Indies. In response, the U.S. cut off the sale of oil to Japan, which thus lost more than 95 percent of its oil supply.

Following the American embargo, Japanese planners studied how to seize the Dutch East Indies, which had a large supply of oil. Success required the capture the American Philippines and the British base at Singapore. That required sinking the United States Pacific Fleet, which was stationed at the naval base at Pearl Harbor in Hawaii. The planners did not see the total defeat of the United States as a feasible outcome. Japanese leaders expected that a decisive naval victory would convince Washington to negotiate a compromise. Prime Minister Konoye sought a summit with Roosevelt in order to negotiate a deal, but Roosevelt insisted the Japanese withdrawal from China first. Tojo succeeded Konoye as prime minister in October, 1941, and the Japanese began preparations for an attack on American, British and Dutch possessions. In November, Nomura made a final offer, asking for reopened trade and acceptance of the Japanese campaign in China in return for Japan's pledge not to attack Southeast Asia. In part because the U.S. feared that Japan would attack the Soviet Union after conquering China, Roosevelt rejected the offer, and negotiations collapsed on November 26.

=== Entrance into the war ===
On the morning of December 7, 1941, the Japanese struck the U.S. naval base at Pearl Harbor with a surprise attack, knocking out the main American battleship fleet and killing 2,403 American servicemen and civilians. Mainstream scholars have all rejected the conspiracy thesis that Roosevelt, or any other high government officials, knew in advance about the Japanese attack on Pearl Harbor. The Japanese had kept their secrets closely guarded, and while senior American officials were aware that war was imminent, they did not expect an attack on Pearl Harbor.

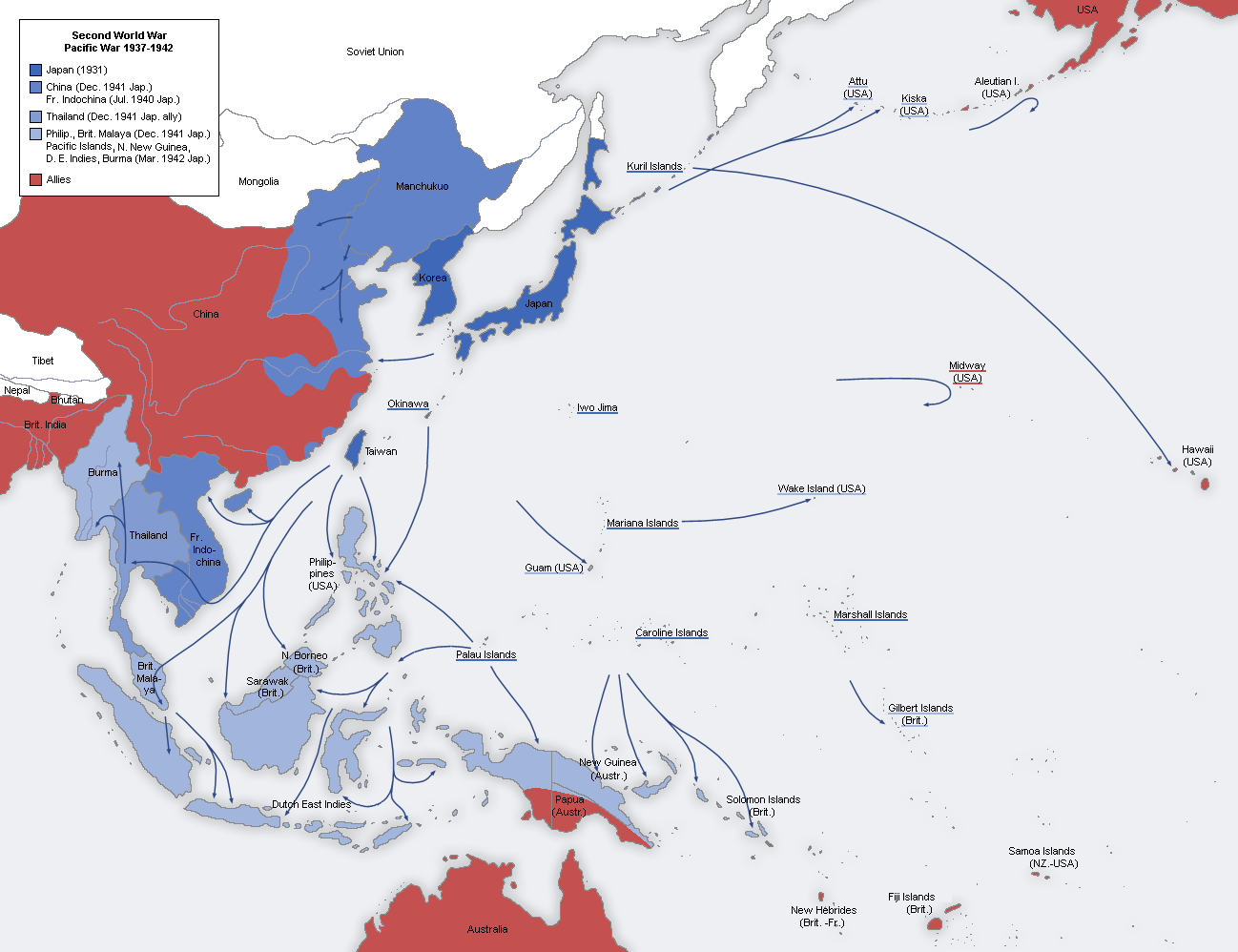
Map of Japanese military advances, until mid-1942

After Pearl Harbor, antiwar sentiment in the United States evaporated overnight. For the first time since the early 19th century, foreign policy became the top priority for the American public. Roosevelt called for war in his famous "Infamy Speech" to Congress, in which he said: "Yesterday, December 7, 1941—a date which will live in infamy—the United States of America was suddenly and deliberately attacked by naval and air forces of the Empire of Japan." On December 8, Congress voted almost unanimously to declare war against Japan. On December 11, 1941, Germany declared war on the United States, which responded in kind.

Roosevelt portrayed the war as a crusade against the aggressive dictatorships that threatened peace and democracy throughout the world. He and his military advisers implemented a Europe-first strategy with the objectives of halting the German advances in the Soviet Union and in North Africa; launching an invasion of western Europe with the aim of crushing Nazi Germany between two fronts; and saving China and defeating Japan. Public opinion, however, gave priority to the destruction of Japan. In any case, Japan was attacking the American Philippines and so in practice the Pacific had priority in 1942. Japan bombed American air bases in the Philippines just hours after the attack on Pearl Harbor and destroyed the B-17 fleet parked on the ground. By the end of the month, the Japanese had invaded the Philippines. General Douglas MacArthur led American resistance in the Philippines until March 1942, when Roosevelt ordered him to evacuate to Australia, which became the forward American base. American forces in the Philippines surrendered in May 1942, leaving Japan with approximately ten thousand American prisoners. While it was subduing the Philippines, Japan also conquered Malaya, Singapore, Burma, and the Dutch East Indies.

In his role as the leader of the United States before and during World War II, Roosevelt tried to avoid repeating what he saw as Woodrow Wilson's mistakes in World War I. He often made exactly the opposite decision. Wilson had called for neutrality in thought and deed, while Roosevelt made it clear his administration strongly favored Britain and China. Unlike the loans in World War I, the United States made large-scale grants of military and economic aid to the Allies through Lend-Lease, with little expectation of repayment. Wilson failed to expand war production before the declaration of war; Roosevelt made an all-out effort in 1940. Wilson waited for the declaration to begin a draft; Roosevelt started one in 1940. Wilson never made the United States an official ally but Roosevelt did. Wilson never met with the top Allied leaders but Roosevelt did. Wilson proclaimed independent policy, as seen in the 14 Points, while Roosevelt sought a collaborative policy with the Allies. In 1917, the United States declared war on Germany; in 1941, Roosevelt waited until the enemy attacked at Pearl Harbor. Wilson refused to collaborate with the Republicans; Roosevelt named leading Republicans to head the War Department and the Navy Department. Wilson let General George Pershing make the major military decisions; Roosevelt made the major decisions in his war including the "Europe first" strategy. He rejected the idea of an armistice and demanded unconditional surrender. Roosevelt often mentioned his role as Assistant Secretary of the Navy in the Wilson administration, but added that he had profited more from Wilson's errors than from his successes. Robert E. Sherwood argues:

Roosevelt could never forget Wilson's mistakes.... there was no motivating force in all of Roosevelt's wartime political policy stronger than the determination to prevent repetition of the same mistakes.

== Alliances, economic warfare, and other wartime issues ==
=== Four Policemen ===
In late December 1941 Churchill and Roosevelt met at the Arcadia Conference in Washington, which established a joint strategy between the U.S. and Britain. Both agreed on a Europe first strategy that would prioritize the defeat of Germany before Japan. With British forces focused on the war in Europe, and with the Soviet Union not at war with Japan, the United States would take the lead in the Pacific War despite its own focus on Germany. The U.S. and Britain established the Combined Chiefs of Staff to coordinate military policy and the Combined Munitions Assignments Board to coordinate the allocation of supplies. An agreement was also reached to establish a centralized command in the Pacific theater called ABDA, named for the American, British, Dutch, and Australian forces in the theater. On January 1, 1942, the United States, Britain, China, the Soviet Union, and twenty-two other countries issued the Declaration by United Nations, in which each nation pledged to defeat the Axis powers. These countries opposed to the Axis would be known as the Allied Powers; sometimes they were called the "United Nations" before the UN was set up in 1945.

Roosevelt coined the term "Four Policemen" to refer to the "Big Four" Allied powers of World War II: the United States, the United Kingdom, the Soviet Union, and China. Roosevelt, Churchill, Soviet leader Joseph Stalin, and Chinese Generalissimo Chiang Kai-shek cooperated informally on a plan in which American and British troops concentrated in the West, Soviet troops fought on the Eastern front, and Chinese, British, and American troops fought in Asia and the Pacific. The Allies formulated strategy in a series of high-profile conferences as well as contact through diplomatic and military channels. Roosevelt had a close relationship with Churchill, but he and his advisers quickly lost respect for Chiang's government, viewing it as hopelessly corrupt. General Joseph Stilwell, who was assigned to lead U.S. forces in the China Burma India Theater, came to believe that Chiang was more concerned with defeating Mao's Communists than with defeating the Japanese. U.S. and Soviet leaders distrusted each other throughout the war, and relations further suffered after 1943 as both sides supported sympathetic governments in liberated territories.

=== Other allies ===
By the end of the war, several states, including all of Latin America, had joined the Allies. Roosevelt's appointment of young Nelson Rockefeller to head the new, well-funded Office of the Coordinator of Inter-American Affairs provided energetic leadership. Under Rockefeller's leadership, the U.S. spent millions on radio broadcasts, motion pictures, and other anti-fascist propaganda. American advertising techniques generated a push back in Mexico especially, where well-informed locals resisted heavy-handed American influence. Nevertheless, Mexico was a valuable ally in the war. A deal was reached whereby 250,000 Mexican citizens living in the United States served in the American forces; over 1000 were killed in combat. In addition to propaganda, large sums were allocated for economic support and development. On the whole the Roosevelt policy in Latin America was a political success, except in Argentina, which tolerated German influence and refused to follow Washington's lead until the war was practically over. Outside of Latin America, the U.S. paid particularly close attention to its oil-rich allies in the Middle East, marking the start of sustained American engagement in the region.

=== Lend-Lease and economic warfare ===
The main American role in the war, beyond the military mission itself, was financing the war and providing large quantities of munitions and civilian goods. Lend-Lease, as passed by Congress in 1941, was a declaration of economic warfare, and that economic warfare continued after the attack on Pearl Harbor. Roosevelt believed that the financing of World War I through loans to the Allies, with the demand for repayment after the war, had been a mistake. He set up the Lend-Lease system as a war program, financed through the military budget; as soon as the war with Japan ended, it was terminated. The president chose the leadership—Hopkins and Edward Stettinius Jr. played major roles—and exercised close oversight and control. One problem that bedeviled the program in 1942 was the strictly-limited supply of munitions that had to be divided between Lend-Lease and American forces. Roosevelt insisted to the military that Russia was to get all the supplies he had promised it. Lend-Lease aid to the Soviet Union declined somewhat in mid-1942 after the United States began to prepare for military operations in North Africa.

The U.S. spent about $40 billion on Lend-Lease aid to the British Empire, the Soviet Union, France, China, and some smaller countries. That amounted to about 11% of the cost of the war to the U.S. It received back about $7.8 billion in goods and services provided by the recipients to the United States, especially the cost of food and rent for American installations abroad. Britain received $30 billion, Russia received $10.7 billion, and all other countries $2.9 billion. When the question of repayment arose, Roosevelt insisted the United States did not want a postwar debt problem of the sort that had troubled relations after the first world war. The recipients provided bases and supplies to American forces on their own soil; this was referred informally as "Reverse Lend-Lease," and the combined total of this aid came to approximately $7.8 billion overall. In the end, none of the Allied Powers paid for the goods received during the war, although they did pay for goods in transit that were received after the program ended. Roosevelt told Congress in June 1942:

The real costs of the war cannot be measured, nor compared, nor paid for in money. They must and are being met in blood and toil.... If each country devotes roughly the same fraction of its national production to the war, then the financial burden of war is distributed equally among the United Nations in accordance with their ability to pay.

A major issue in the economic war was the transportation of supplies. After Germany declared war on the United States, Hitler removed all restrictions on the German submarine fleet. German submarines ravaged Allied shipping in the Atlantic, with many of the attacks taking place within ten miles of the East Coast of the United States in early 1942. The U.S. Navy faced difficulties in simultaneously protecting Atlantic shipping while also prosecuting the war against Japan, and over one millions tons of Allied shipping was lost in 1942. The cracking of the German Enigma code, along with the construction and deployment of American naval escorts and maritime patrol aircraft helped give the Allied Powers the upper hand in the Battle of the Atlantic after 1942. After the Allies sank dozens of U-boats in early 1943, most German submarines were withdrawn from the North Atlantic.

The United States began a strategic bombing campaign against Axis forces in Europe in mid-1942. Attacks initially targeted locations in France, Belgium, and the Netherlands; U.S. bombers launched their first attack against a target in Germany in January 1943. In an attempt to destroy Germany's industrial capacity, Allied bombers struck targets such as oil refineries and ball-bearing factories. After taking heavy losses in Operation Tidal Wave and the Second Raid on Schweinfurt, the U.S. significantly scaled back the strategic bombing of Germany. General Carl Andrew Spaatz redirected U.S. strategic bombing efforts to focus on German aircraft production facilities, and the Allies enjoyed air superiority in Europe after February 1944. Allied strategic bombing escalated in late 1944, with an emphasis placed on Germany's transportation infrastructure and oil resources. With the goal of forcing a quick German surrender, in 1945 the Allies launched attacks on Berlin and Dresden that killed tens of thousands of civilians.

=== Reaction to the Holocaust ===
After Kristallnacht in 1938, Roosevelt helped expedite Jewish immigration from Germany and allowed Austrian and German citizens already in the United States to stay indefinitely. He was prevented from accepting more Jewish immigrants by the prevalence of nativism and antisemitism among voters and members of Congress, resistance in the American Jewish community to the acceptance of Eastern European Jewish immigrants, and the restrictive Immigration Act of 1924. The Immigration Act of 1924 allowed only 150,000 immigrants to the United States per year and set firm quotas for each country, and in the midst of the Great Depression there was little popular support for revisions to the law that would have allowed for a more liberal immigration policy. Roosevelt pushed the limits of his executive authority where possible, which allowed for several Austrian and German Jews, including Albert Einstein, to escape from Europe or remain in the United States past their visa expirations.

Hitler chose to implement the "Final Solution"—the extermination of the European Jewish population—by January 1942, and American officials learned of the scale of the Nazi extermination campaign in the following months. Against the objections of the State Department, Roosevelt convinced the other Allied leaders to jointly issue the Joint Declaration by Members of the United Nations, which condemned the ongoing Holocaust and promised to try its perpetrators as war criminals. In January 1944, Roosevelt established the War Refugee Board to aid Jews and other victims of Axis atrocities. Aside from these actions, Roosevelt believed that the best way to help the persecuted populations of Europe was to end the war as quickly as possible. Top military leaders and War Department leaders rejected any campaign to bomb the extermination camps or the rail lines leading to the camps, fearing it would be a diversion from the war effort. According to biographer Jean Edward Smith, there is no evidence that anyone ever proposed such a campaign to Roosevelt himself.

== Homefront ==
=== Relations with Congress ===
Up until Pearl Harbor, Congress played a very active role in foreign and military policy, dealing with neutrality laws, the draft, and Lend Lease. As with the general public, congressional sentiment was very hostile toward Germany and Japan, favorable toward China, and somewhat less favorable toward Britain. Congressmen with strong German, Irish Catholic, or Scandinavian constituencies generally supported isolationist policies. After Pearl Harbor, isolationism disappeared in Congress and was not a factor in the 1942 or 1944 elections. Some leading Republican isolationists, most notably Senator Arthur Vandenberg of Michigan, Senator Warren Austin of Vermont, and Congressman Everett Dirksen of Illinois, became leading internationalists. Republican Senator Robert A. Taft stayed quiet on foreign and defense issues, while many of the energetic isolationists of the 1930s, including Hiram Johnson and William Borah, were in poor health or had seen their influence decline. During the war, there were no secret briefings, and members of Congress were often no better informed than the average newspaper reader. Congressman did pay attention to military installations in their district, but rarely raised issues of broader military or diplomatic scope, with the partial exception of postwar plans. Congress also established the Truman Committee, which investigated wartime profiteering and other defects in war production. Debates on domestic policy were as heated as ever, and the major Republican gains in Congress in 1938 and 1942 gave the Conservative Coalition the dominant voice on most domestic issues.

=== Domestic legislation ===
The home front was subject to dynamic social changes throughout the war, though domestic issues were no longer Roosevelt's most urgent policy concern. The military buildup spurred economic growth. Unemployment fell in half from 7.7 million in early 1940 to 3.4 million in late 1941, and fell in half again to 1.5 million in late 1942, out of a labor force of 54 million. (Note: WPA workers were counted as unemployed by this set of statistics.) To pay for increased government spending, in 1941 Roosevelt proposed that Congress enact an income tax rate of 99.5% on all income over $100,000; when the proposal failed, he issued an executive order imposing an income tax of 100% on income over $25,000, which Congress rescinded. The Revenue Act of 1942 instituted top tax rates as high as 94% (after accounting for the excess profits tax) and instituted the first federal withholding tax. It also greatly increased the tax base; only four million Americans paid the federal income taxes before the war, while by the end of the war over 40 million Americans paid federal income taxes. In 1944, Roosevelt requested that Congress enact legislation which would tax all "unreasonable" profits, both corporate and individual, and thereby support his declared need for over $10 billion in revenue for the war and other government measures. Congress overrode Roosevelt's veto to pass a smaller revenue bill raising $2 billion. Congress also abolished several New Deal agencies, including the CCC and the WPA.

Roosevelt announces the plan for a bill of social and economic rights in January, 1944.

Congress and Roosevelt took steps to adjust the Thanksgiving Holiday during the month of November. They wanted to increase the number of Christmas holiday shopping days during December and November to reduce the number of people shopping at the stores at the same time. Many governors refused to follow the new designated Thanksgiving date. President Roosevelt eventually signed the new date into law on December 20, 1941. The new date has been the 4th Thursday of November since 1942. For a short time, some states observed both the 5th Thursday and 4th Thursday of November as the Thanksgiving Holiday.

Roosevelt's 1944 State of the Union Address advocated a set of basic economic rights Roosevelt dubbed as the Second Bill of Rights. In the most ambitious domestic proposal of the era, veterans groups led by the American Legion secured the G.I. Bill, which created a massive benefits program for almost all men and women who served. Roosevelt had wanted a narrower bill focused more on poor people, but he was out-maneuvered by those on both his right and his left who, each for their own reasons, favored a blanket approach. Comprehensive coverage, regardless of income or combat experience, would avoid the prolonged disputes in the 1920s and 1930s over the aid to veterans. Benefits included a year of unemployment pay at $20 a week, tuition and living expense to attend high school or college, and low-cost loans to buy a home, farm or business. Of the fifteen million Americans who served in World War II, more than half would benefit from the educational opportunities provided for in the G.I. Bill.

=== Wartime welfare projects ===
Conservative domination of Congress during the war meant that all welfare projects and reforms had to have their approval, which was given when business supported the project. For example, the Coal Mines Inspection and Investigation Act of 1941 significantly reduced fatality rates in the coal-mining industry, saving workers' lives and company money. In terms of welfare, the New Dealers wanted benefits for everyone according to need. However, conservatives proposed benefits based on national service—especially tied to military service or working in war industries—and their approach won out.

The Community Facilities Act of 1940 (the Lanham Act) provided federal funds to defense-impacted communities where the population had soared and local facilities were overwhelmed. It provided money for the building of segregated housing for war workers as well as recreational facilities, water, and sanitation plants, hospitals, day care centers, and schools.

The Servicemen's Dependents Allowance Act of 1942 provided family allowances for dependents of enlisted men. Emergency grants to states were authorized in 1942 for programs for day care for children of working mothers. In 1944, pensions were authorized for all physically or mentally helpless children of deceased veterans regardless of the age of the child at the date the claim was filed or at the time of the veteran's death, provided the child was disabled at the age of sixteen and that the disability continued to the date of the claim. The Public Health Service Act, which was passed that same year, expanded federal-state public health programs and increased the annual amount for grants for public health services.

The Emergency Maternity and Infant Care (EMIC) program, introduced in March 1943 by the Children's Bureau, provided free maternity care and medical treatment during an infant's first year for the wives and children of military personnel in the four lowest enlisted pay grades. One out of seven births was covered during its operation. EMIC paid $127 million to state health departments to cover the care of 1.2 million new mothers and their babies. The average cost of EMIC maternity cases completed was $92.49 for medical and hospital care. A striking effect was the sudden rapid decline in home births as most mothers now had paid hospital maternity care.

Under the 1943 Disabled Veterans Rehabilitation Act, vocational rehabilitation services were offered to wounded World War II veterans and some 621,000 veterans would go on to receive assistance under this program. The G.I. Bill (Servicemen's Readjustment Act of 1944) was a landmark piece of legislation, providing 16 million returning veterans with benefits such as housing, educational and unemployment assistance and played a major role in the postwar expansion of the American middle class.

=== War production ===
To coordinate war production and other aspects of the home front, Roosevelt established the War Shipping Administration, the Office of Price Administration, the Board of Economic Warfare, and the War Labor Board. The U.S. government generally relied on voluntary contracting to mobilize the production of war materials, but in rare cases the Roosevelt administration temporarily took control of industrial facilities. Congress also created tax incentives designed to encourage the shift to military production, while the Reconstruction Finance Corporation continued to offer loans to help expand industrial capacity. Despite efforts made by Congress to encourage contracting with smaller companies, most military contracts went to the largest corporations in the United States. War production increased dramatically after the attack on Pearl Harbor, but that production fell short of the goals established by the president, due in part to manpower shortages. The effort was also hindered by numerous strikes, especially among union workers in the coal mining and railroad industries, which lasted well into 1944. Mobilization was also affected by the military service of over 16 million individuals during the war; approximately one-in-five families had at least one individual serve during the war.

Despite various challenges, between 1941 and 1945, the United States produced 2.4 million trucks, 300,000 military aircraft, 88,400 tanks, and 40 billion rounds of ammunition. The production capacity of the United States dwarfed that of other countries; for example, in 1944, the United States produced more military aircraft than the combined production of Germany, Japan, Britain, and the Soviet Union. The United States suffered from inflation during the war, and the administration instituted price and wage controls. In 1943, Roosevelt established the Office of War Mobilization (OWM) to oversee war production. The OWM was led by James F. Byrnes, who came to be known as the "assistant president" due to his influence. As inflation continued to present a major challenge, the administration expanded a rationing program that covered an increasing number of consumer goods.

=== Atomic bomb ===
In August 1939, physicists Leo Szilard and Albert Einstein sent the Einstein–Szilárd letter to Roosevelt, warning of the possibility of a German project to develop an atomic bomb (now called a "nuclear weapon"). The thought of Germany to build a bomb first was terrifying. Roosevelt authorized preliminary research. (Note: The Germans stopped research on nuclear weapons in 1942, deciding it was too hard to make a bomb. Japan gave up its own small program in 1943.) After Pearl Harbor, a few top Congressional leaders secretly gave the administration the necessary money. General Leslie Groves, the Army's engineer who built the Pentagon, took charge of the Manhattan Project. Roosevelt and Churchill agreed to jointly pursue the project with the Quebec Agreement allowing American scientists to cooperate with their British counterparts, including at least one spy who provided Moscow with the top secret details. The Manhattan Project cost more than $2 billion, employed 150,000 individuals, and required the construction of massive facilities at Oak Ridge, Los Alamos, and other parts of the country.

=== African Americans during the war ===
In 1941, A. Philip Randolph and other African-American leaders planned a march on Washington to protest segregation in the military and the defense industry. In response, Roosevelt issued Executive Order 8802, which prohibited racial and religious discrimination in employment among defense contractors. Randolph then cancelled the march on Washington. Roosevelt also established the Fair Employment Practices Committee (FEPC) to enforce Executive Order 8802. The FEPC was the first national program directed against employment discrimination, and it played a major role in opening up new employment opportunities to non-white workers. During the war, the number of African Americans employed in the defense industry increased dramatically, primarily outside the South. Likewise, there was rapid growth in the number of African Americans employed by the federal government in segregated roles. Many African Americans were drafted into the Army. Military units remained segregated and most black people were assigned to non-combat roles. The NAACP grew dramatically during the war, buoyed in part by Randolph's role in convincing Roosevelt to issue Executive Order 8802. The war also saw the acceleration of the Great Migration, as African Americans moved from rural Southern areas to manufacturing centers outside of the South. Roosevelt encouraged employers to hire African Americans, as well as women and ethnics workers, to meet the needs of the wartime labor shortage.

=== Civil liberties ===
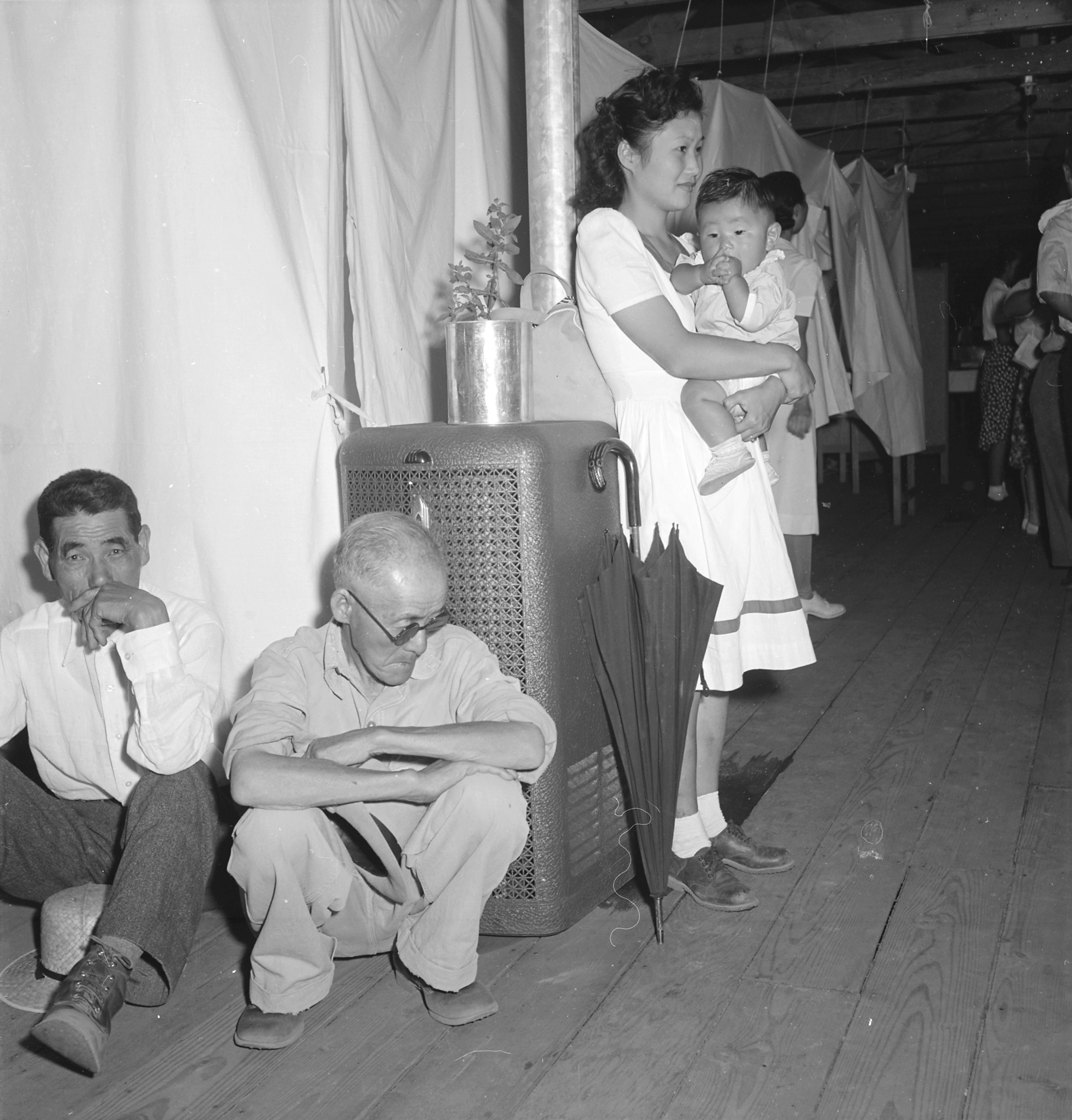
A typical living quarters at the Manzanar internment camp for relocated Japanese.

Roosevelt had cultivated a friendly relationship with the domestic press throughout his presidency, and his good relations with the press helped ensure favorable coverage of his war-time policies without resorting to heavy-handed censorship. During World War I, the U.S. had passed acts such as the Sedition Act of 1918 to crack down on dissent, but Roosevelt largely avoided such harsh measures. He did order FBI Director J. Edgar Hoover to increase its investigations of dissidents and signed the Smith Act, which made it a crime to advocate the overthrow of the federal government. The trials against antiwar spokesmen on the far left and far right collapsed in failure.

The attack on Pearl Harbor raised concerns in the public regarding the possibility of sabotage by Japanese Americans. This suspicion was fed by long-standing racism against Japanese immigrants, as well as the findings of the Roberts Commission, which concluded that the attack on Pearl Harbor had been assisted by Japanese spies. The size of the Japanese population in Hawaii precluded mass internment in that territory, but there was strong popular support for the removal of Japanese from the West Coast. In February 1942, President Roosevelt signed Executive Order 9066, which provided for the relocation of hundreds of thousands of Japanese-American citizens and immigrants from the West Coast. They were forced to liquidate their properties and businesses and interned in hastily built camps in interior, harsh locations. Distracted by other issues, Roosevelt had delegated the decision for internment to Secretary of War Stimson, who in turn relied on the judgment of Assistant Secretary of War John J. McCloy. The Supreme Court upheld the constitutionality of the executive order in the 1944 case of Korematsu v. United States. The internment order was rescinded shortly after the Korematsu decision, and Japanese-Americans were allowed to return to the West Coast. Many German and Italian citizens were also arrested or placed into internment camps.

== Course of the war ==
The two alliances of World War II, with the Axis Powers in blue and the Allied Powers in green

=== Mediterranean and European theater ===
The Soviets urged an Anglo-American invasion of German-occupied France in order to divert troops from the Eastern front. Churchill in particular was reluctant to commit troops in Europe in 1942, and strongly favored launching a campaign designed to expel the Axis Powers from North Africa and to consolidate Allied power in the Mediterranean. General Marshall and Admiral King opposed the decision to prioritize North Africa, which they saw as relatively unimportant to the overall war. Roosevelt overrode their objections, as he wanted the U.S. to commit ground forces in the European theater, in 1942, and with British cooperation.

The Allies invaded French North Africa in November 1942, securing the quick surrender of local Vichy French forces. That surrender was arranged through a deal between General Dwight D. Eisenhower, the supreme commander of the Allied invasion of North Africa, and Vichy Admiral François Darlan. The cooperation with Darlan allowed the Allies to quickly gain control of much of North Africa, but it also alienated Free French leader Charles de Gaulle and other opponents of the Vichy regime. Darlan was assassinated in December 1942, while Vichy France broke relations with the United States and requested that German forces prevent the Allies from gaining control of French Tunisia. The experience with de Gaulle, Darlan, and another French leader, Henri Giraud, convinced Roosevelt of the necessity to avoid becoming closely associated with any French faction for the remainder of the war. In the Tunisian Campaign, Eisenhower initially faced great difficulties in leading his inexperienced force to success, but Allied forces eventually gained the upper hand. 250,000 Axis soldiers surrendered in May 1943, bringing an end to the North African Campaign.

At the January 1943 Casablanca Conference, the U.S. and Britain agreed to defeat Axis forces in North Africa and then launch an invasion of Sicily after the North African campaign, with an attack on France to follow in 1944. At the conference, Roosevelt also announced that he would only accept the unconditional surrender of Germany, Japan, and Italy. The demand for unconditional surrender was calculated to reassure the Soviets, who were still insisting on an immediate attack on German-occupied France, that the United States would not seek a negotiated peace with Germany. In February 1943, the Soviet Union turned the tide on the eastern front by winning a decisive victory at the Battle of Stalingrad. The Allies launched an invasion of Sicily in July 1943, capturing the island by the end of the following month. During the campaign in Sicily, King Victor Emmanuel III of Italy arrested Mussolini and replaced him with Pietro Badoglio, who secretly negotiated a surrender with the Allies. Despite his earlier insistence on unconditional surrender, Roosevelt accepted armistice terms that allowed Badoglio to remain in power. Germany quickly restored Mussolini to power and set up a puppet state in northern Italy. The Allied invasion of mainland Italy commenced in September 1943, but the Italian Campaign moved slowly until 1945. Roosevelt consented to the campaign only on the condition that the British commit to an invasion of France in mid-1944, and the Allied Powers began to build up a force for that operation, diverting soldiers from the Italian Campaign.

To command the invasion of France, Roosevelt passed over Marshall and in favor of General Eisenhower. Roosevelt had originally wanted to appoint Marshall to the command, but top military leaders argued that Marshall was indispensable in his role in Washington. While building up forces in Britain, the Allied Powers engaged in Operation Bodyguard, an elaborate campaign designed to mask where the Allies would land in Northwestern Europe. Eisenhower launched Operation Overlord, a landing in the Northern French region of Normandy, on June 6, 1944. Supported by 12,000 aircraft that provided complete control of the air, and the largest naval force ever assembled, the Allies successfully established a beachhead in Normandy and then advanced further into France. Though reluctant to back an unelected government, Roosevelt recognized Charles de Gaulle's Provisional Government of the French Republic as the de facto government of France in July 1944.

After the Battle of the Falaise Pocket, the Allies pushed Axis forces back towards Germany, capturing Paris in August 1944. That same month, the Allies launched Operation Dragoon, an invasion of Southern France. Facing logistical issues, Allied forces attempted to secure the Belgian port of Antwerp before moving on Germany's Ruhr region, but the failure of Operation Market Garden delayed the Allied invasion of Germany. In late 1944, Hitler began to amass forces for a major offensive designed to convince the United States and Britain to seek a negotiated peace. A surprise German attack in December 1944 marked the start of the Battle of the Bulge, but the Allies were able to beat back the attack in the following weeks. The Allies advanced across the Rhine River in March 1945, and took control of the Ruhr and the Saarland, another key industrial region. By April 1945, Nazi resistance was crumbling in the face of advances by both the Western Allies and the Soviet Union.

=== Pacific theater ===
After sweeping across Maritime Southeast Asia in the months following Pearl Harbor, Japan looked to further expand its territory, taking control of the Solomon Islands and parts of New Guinea. In May 1942, American and Australian forces defeated the Japanese in the Battle of the Coral Sea, prompting a Japanese land campaign across the island of New Guinea. Seeking to seize control of a strategically placed island and destroy the U.S. fleet in the Pacific, Japan also launched an attack on the American-held Midway Atoll. With the assistance of the Magic cryptanalysis project, Admiral Chester Nimitz led an American force that defeated the Japanese navy at the Battle of Midway. The Battle of Midway resulted in the Japanese fleet's loss of four crucial aircraft carriers, and the battle marked a major reversal of fortune in the Pacific War. In August 1942, the United States launched an invasion of the Japanese-held South Pacific island of Guadalcanal in the Solomon Islands; Japanese and American forces contested control of Guadalcanal until February 1943. After the Battle of Guadalcanal, the U.S. adopted an island hopping strategy in order to avoid entrenched Japanese garrisons. By early 1944, Allied forces had established control over much of New Guinea and had landed on the adjacent island of New Britain.

While the campaign in the Southwest Pacific continued, U.S. forces launched an offensive in the Central Pacific, beginning with the November 1943 Battle of Tarawa. The U.S. next captured Japanese positions in the Marshall Islands and the Caroline Islands. In June 1944, the U.S. launched an attack on Saipan, in the Mariana Islands, gaining control of the island in early July at the cost of fourteen thousand casualties. As the Battle of Saipan continued, the U.S. won a major naval victory in the Battle of the Philippine Sea, sinking three Japanese aircraft carriers. In July 1944, Roosevelt met with Nimitz and MacArthur, where he authorized the continuation of the campaigns in the Southwest Pacific and the Central Pacific. MacArthur's force would continue its advance towards the Philippines, while the Central Pacific campaign would work its way towards Japan. The U.S. landed on the Philippine island of Leyte in October 1944, provoking a Japanese naval response, as the Philippine Islands maintained a critical position on the Japanese oil supply route from the Dutch East Indies. The Japanese navy was decimated in the resulting Battle of Leyte Gulf, which is sometimes claimed to be the "largest naval battle in history." MacArthur's forces secured control of Leyte in December and had largely re-taken control of the Philippines by March 1945.

The U.S. began launching strategic bombing raids on Japan from the Mariana Islands in November 1944, but Japan still controlled several islands that provided defense for the Japanese archipelago. In February 1945, the U.S. launched an invasion of the well-defended island of Iwo Jima, taking control of that island the following month. On April 1, the U.S. landed on Okinawa Island, the largest of the Ryukyu Islands. The Japanese allowed the Americans to land on the island before launching a fierce attack that included kamikaze suicide attacks by Japanese aircraft. Japanese forces on Okinawa held out until June 1945; U.S. forces suffered over 60,000 casualties during the operation.

== Post-war planning ==
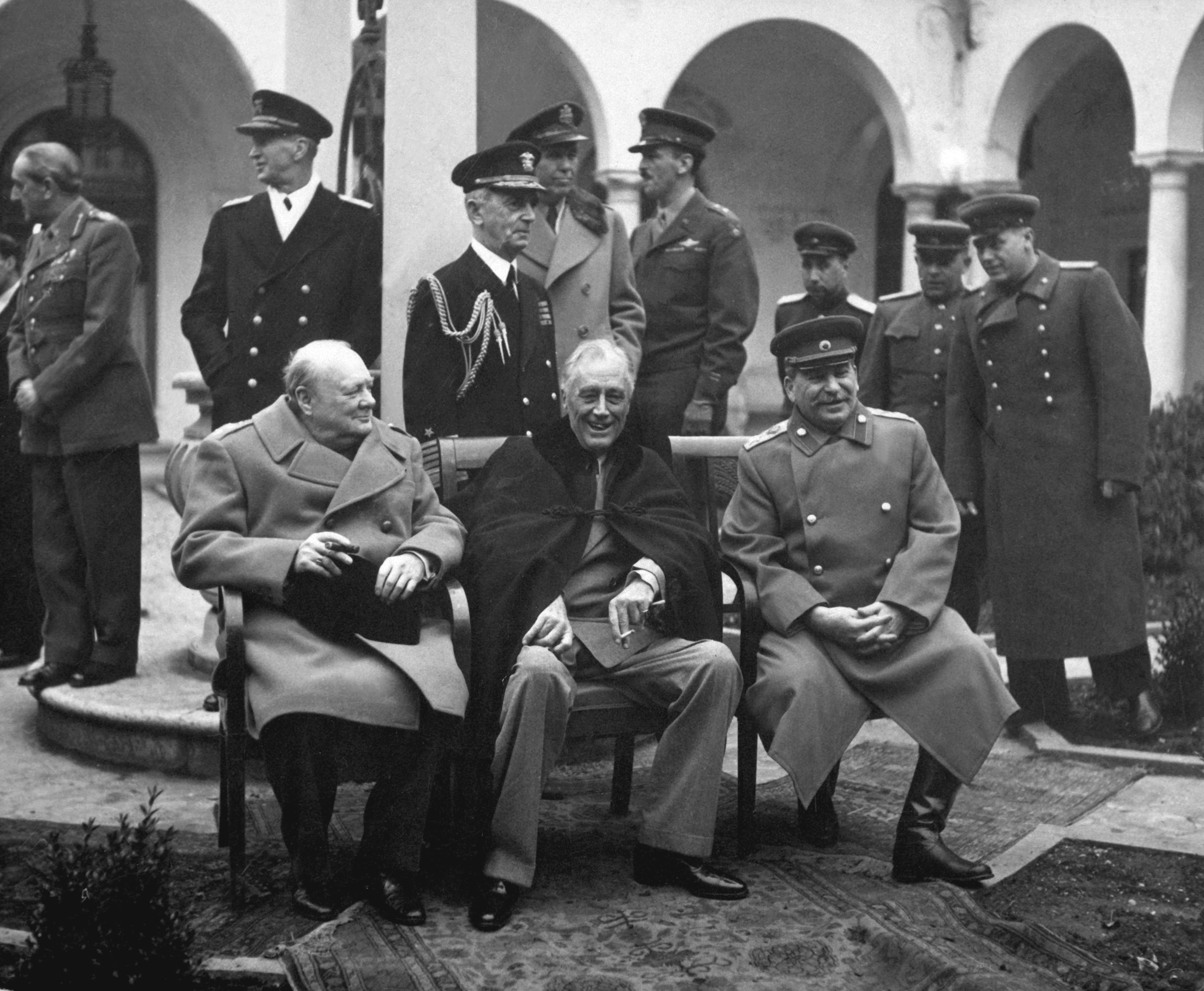
Churchill, FDR, and Stalin at Yalta, two months before Roosevelt's death

In late 1943, Roosevelt, Churchill, and Stalin agreed to meet to discuss strategy and post-war plans at the Tehran Conference, which marked Roosevelt's first face-to-face meeting with Stalin. At the conference, Britain and the United States committed to opening a second front against Germany in 1944, while Stalin committed to entering the war against Japan at an unspecified date. Roosevelt also privately indicated acceptance of Soviet control of the Baltic states and Soviet plans to shift Poland's borders to the west. Stalin, meanwhile, committed to joining the war against Japan after the defeat of Germany.

Post-war plans increasingly came to the fore as the Allies won several major victories in 1944. The wartime economic boom and the experience of the Great Depression convinced many Americans of the need to lower trade barriers. Lend-Lease agreements included provisions for eliminating tariffs, and the U.S. especially desired the dismantlement of the British Imperial Preference system. At the Bretton Woods Conference, the Allies agreed to the creation of the International Monetary Fund, which would provide for currency stabilization, and the World Bank, which would fund post-war rebuilding. Taking up the Wilsonian mantle, Roosevelt also pushed for the establishment of the United Nations, a permanent intergovernmental organization that would succeed the League of Nations.

Roosevelt, Churchill, and Stalin met for a second time at the February 1945 Yalta Conference. With the end of the war in Europe approaching, Roosevelt's primary focus was on convincing Stalin to enter the war against Japan; the Joint Chiefs had estimated that an American invasion of Japan would cause as many as one million American casualties. In return for the Soviet Union's entrance into the war against Japan, the Soviet Union was promised control of Asian territories such as Sakhalin Island. With the Soviet Union in control of much of Eastern Europe by early 1945, Roosevelt had little leverage over Soviet actions in Eastern Europe. He did not push for the immediate evacuation of Soviet soldiers from Poland, but he did win the issuance of the Declaration on Liberated Europe, which promised free elections in countries that had been occupied by Germany. Against Soviet pressure, Roosevelt and Churchill refused to consent to imposing huge reparations and deindustrialization on Germany after the war. Roosevelt's role in the Yalta Conference has been controversial; critics charge that he naively trusted the Soviet Union to allow free elections in Eastern Europe, while supporters argue that there was little more that Roosevelt could have done for the Eastern European countries given the Soviet occupation and the need for cooperation with the Soviet Union during and after the war.

=== Founding the United Nations ===
At the Yalta Conference, Roosevelt, Churchill, and Stalin agreed to the establishment of the United Nations, as well as the structure of the United Nations Security Council, which would be charged with ensuring international peace and security. The participants at Yalta also agreed that the United Nations would convene for the first time in San Francisco in April 1945 in the United Nations Conference on International Organization. Roosevelt considered the United Nations to be his most important legacy. He provided continuous backstage political support inside the United States, and with Churchill and Stalin abroad. He made sure that leading Republicans were on board, especially Senators Arthur Vandenberg of Michigan, and Warren Austin of Vermont. The Allies had agreed to the basic structure of the new body at the Dumbarton Oaks Conference in 1944. The Big Four of the United States, Britain, Soviet Union and China would make the major decisions, with France added later to provide permanent members of the all-powerful Security Council. Each had a veto power, thus avoiding the fatal weakness of the League of Nations, which had theoretically been able order its members to act in defiance of their own parliaments.

=== Anti-imperialism ===
British, French, and Dutch leaders all hoped to retain or reclaim their colonial possessions after the war. The U.S. was committed to granting independence to the Philippines following the end of the war, and Roosevelt frequently pressured Churchill to similarly commit to the independence of India, Burma, Malaya, and Hong Kong. His motives included principled opposition to colonialism, practical concern for the outcome of the war, and the need to build support for the U.S. in a future independent India. Churchill was deeply committed to imperialism and pushed back hard. Because the U.S. needed British cooperation in India to support China, Roosevelt had to draw back on his anti-colonialism. That annoyed Indian nationalist leaders, though most of those leaders were in British prisons for the duration because they would not support the war against Japan. Roosevelt also promised to return Chinese territories seized by Japan since 1895, and ended the practice of American special rights in China.

== 1944 election ==
President Roosevelt defeated Republican Thomas E. Dewey in the 1944 presidential election.

Unlike 1940, Roosevelt openly sought re-election in 1944, and he faced little opposition for the Democratic nomination. Roosevelt favored Henry Wallace or James Byrnes as his running mate in 1944, but Wallace was unpopular among conservatives in the party, while Byrnes was opposed by liberals and Catholics (Byrnes was an ex-Catholic). At the behest of party leaders, Roosevelt eventually got convinced to support and then accepted Missouri Senator Harry S. Truman, who was acceptable to all factions of the political party. Truman was best known for his battle against corruption and inefficiency in wartime spending as the head of the Truman Committee.

Thomas E. Dewey, the governor of New York and an internationalist, was the odds-on favorite and easily won the nomination at the 1944 Republican National Convention. The GOP lambasted FDR and his administration for domestic corruption, bureaucratic inefficiency, tolerance of Communism, and military blunders. Dewey largely avoided foreign policy issues because of the deep split in his party between internationalists and isolationists. Labor unions threw their all-out support behind Roosevelt. Roosevelt won the 1944 election by a comfortable margin with 53.4% of the popular vote and 432 out of the 531 electoral votes.

== Final days and death ==
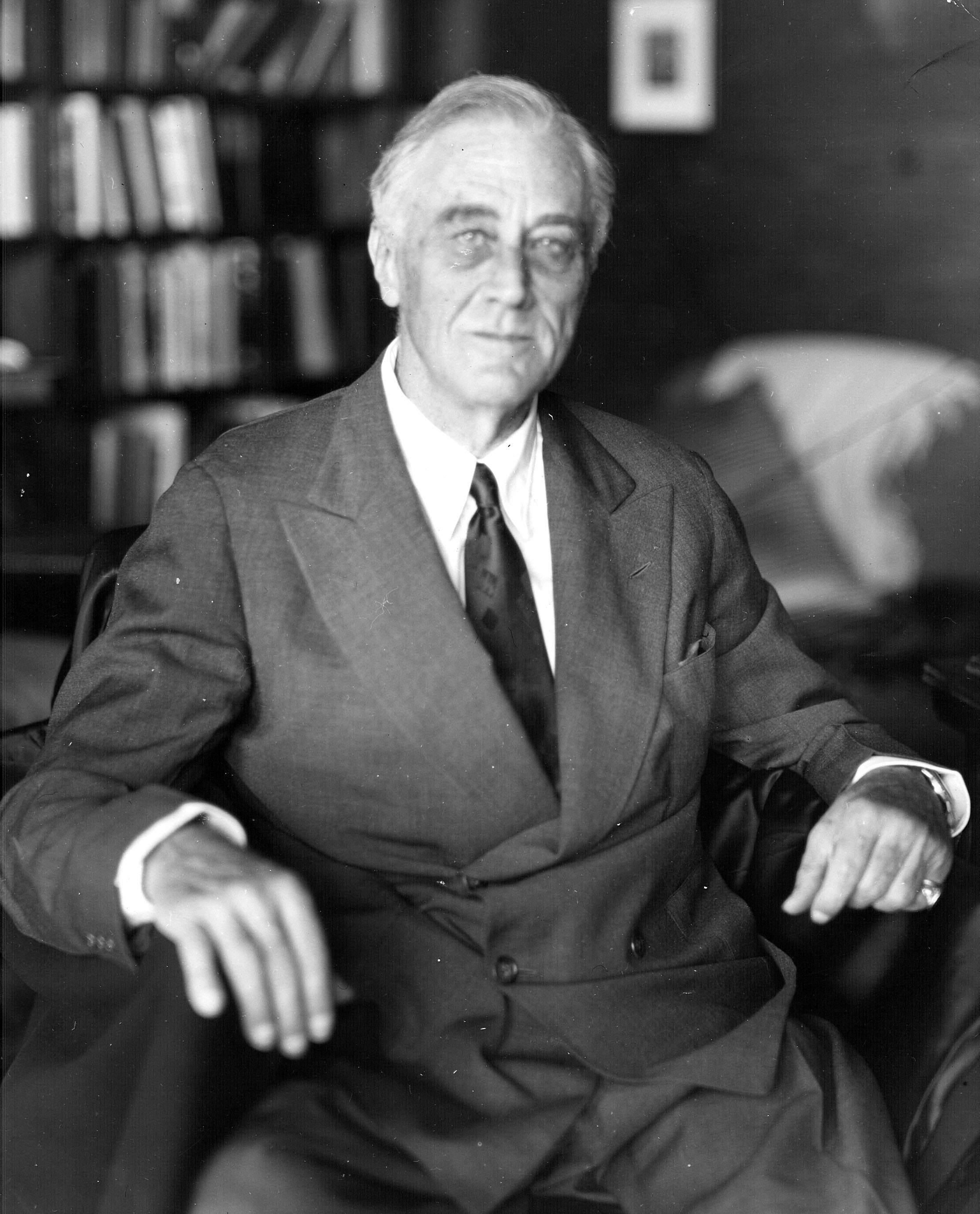
Last photograph of Roosevelt, taken the day before his death (April 11, 1945)

After returning to the United States from the Yalta Conference, Roosevelt addressed Congress on March 1, and many were shocked to see how old, thin and frail he looked. He spoke while seated in the well of the House, an unprecedented concession to his physical incapacity. Still in full command mentally, he firmly stated his primary commitment to a powerful United Nations:

The Crimean Conference [Yalta] ought to spell the end of a system of unilateral action, the exclusive alliances, the spheres of influence, the balances of power, and all the other expedients that have been tried for centuries—and have always failed. We propose to substitute for all these, a universal organization in which all peace-loving nations will finally have a chance to join.

Roosevelt had been in declining health since at least 1940, and by 1944 he was noticeably fatigued. In March 1944, shortly after his 62nd birthday, he underwent testing and was found to have high blood pressure, atherosclerosis, and coronary artery disease. His heart was failing and there was no cure. On March 29, 1945, Roosevelt went to the Little White House at Warm Springs, Georgia, to rest before his anticipated appearance at the founding conference of the United Nations. On April 12, 1945, in Warm Springs, Georgia, while sitting for a portrait by Elizabeth Shoumatoff, Roosevelt said: "I have a terrific headache." He then slumped forward in his chair, unconscious, and was carried into his bedroom. The president's attending cardiologist, Howard Bruenn, diagnosed a massive intracerebral hemorrhage. At 3:35 p.m., Roosevelt died at the age of 63 years old.

The 84th anniversary of the Battle of Fort Sumter (which began the American Civil War) took place on the same day.

Less than a month after his death, on May 8, the war in Europe ended. Harry Truman, who had become president upon Roosevelt's death, dedicated Victory in Europe Day and its celebrations to Roosevelt's memory. Truman kept the flags across the U.S. at half-staff for the remainder of the 30-day mourning period, saying that his only wish was "that Franklin D. Roosevelt had lived to witness this day."

== Historical reputation ==
Roosevelt dedication

The rapid expansion of government programs that occurred during Roosevelt's term redefined the role of the government in the United States, and Roosevelt's advocacy of government social programs was instrumental in redefining liberalism for coming generations. Roosevelt's direct appeals to the public, legislative leadership, and executive reorganization dramatically changed the powers and responsibilities of the president. The New Deal Coalition that he established transformed national politics, ushering in the Fifth Party System. Through his actions before and during World War II, Roosevelt firmly established a leadership role for the United States on the world stage. His isolationist critics faded away, and even the Republicans joined in his overall policies.

Both during and after his terms, critics of Roosevelt questioned not only his policies and positions, but even more so the consolidation of power in the White House at a time when dictators were taking over Europe and Asia. Many of the New Deal programs were abolished during the war by FDR's opponents. The powerful new wartime agencies were set up to be temporary and expire at war's end. The internment of Japanese-Americans is frequently criticized as a major stain on Roosevelt's record.

After Roosevelt's death, his widow Eleanor continued to be a forceful presence in U.S. and world politics, serving as delegate to the conference which established the United Nations and championing civil rights and liberalism generally. Truman replaced the Roosevelt cabinet members but the New Deal coalition persisted into the 1970s. Young New Dealer Lyndon B. Johnson as president in 1964–1966 revived the energy and liberalism of the mid-1930s.

In polls of historians and political scientists, Roosevelt is consistently ranked as one of the three greatest presidents alongside George Washington and Abraham Lincoln. Summing up Roosevelt's impact, historian William E. Leuchtenburg writes:

Franklin Delano Roosevelt served as President from March 1933 to April 1945, the longest tenure in American history. He may have done more during those twelve years to change American society and politics than any of his predecessors in the White House, save Abraham Lincoln. Of course, some of this was the product of circumstances; the Great Depression and the rise of Germany and Japan were beyond FDR's control. But his responses to the challenges he faced made him a defining figure in American history.

== See also ==
- First and second terms of the presidency of Franklin D. Roosevelt
- United States in World War II
- Twenty-second Amendment to the United States Constitution
