= Fort Lawton riot =

Violent conflict between U.S. soldiers and Italian POWs

- Part of World War Two
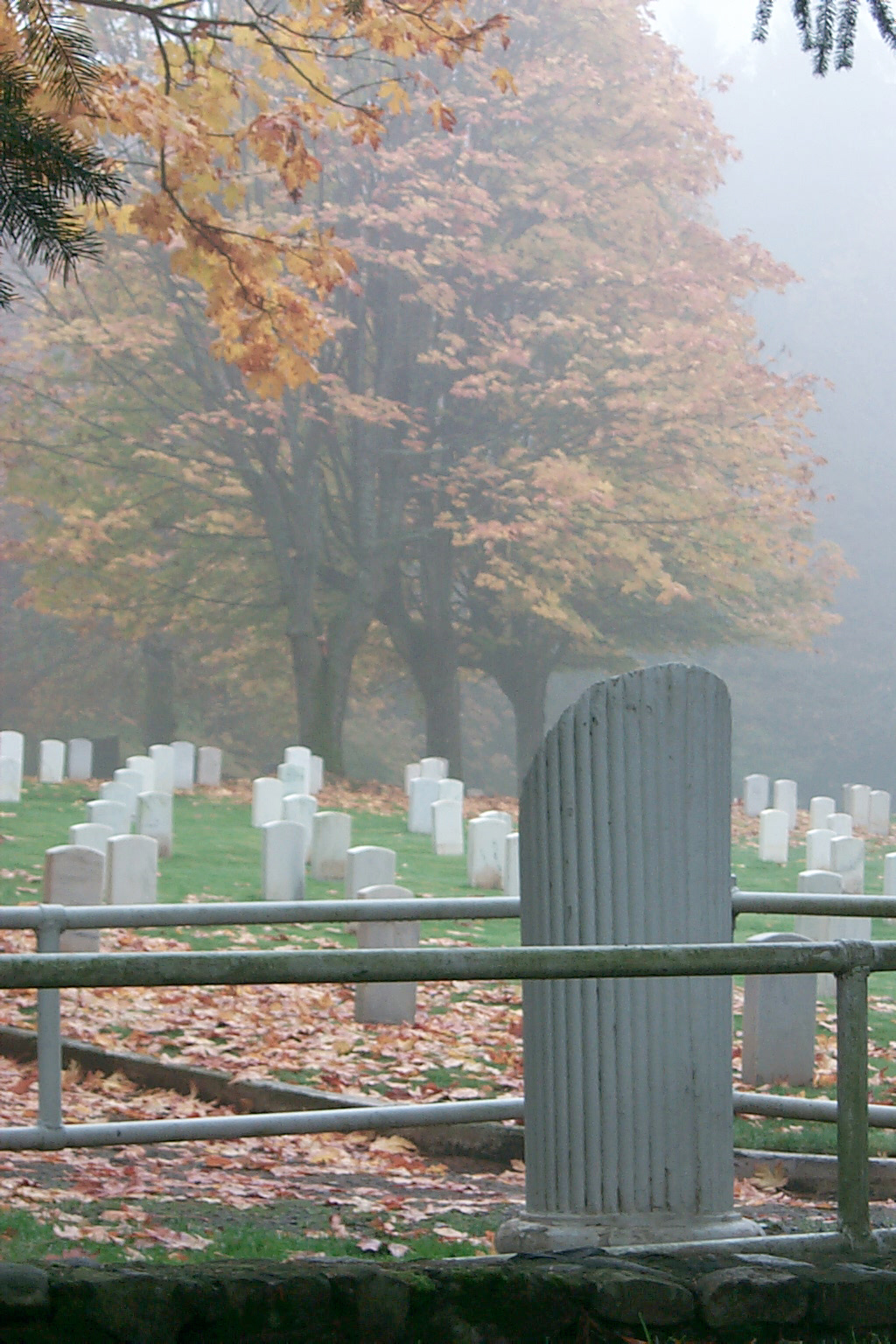
- Headstone of Pvt. Guglielmo Olivotto at Fort Lawton military cemetery, Seattle
- Date: August 14, 1944
- Location: Fort Lawton, Washington, United States (U.S.)
- Participants: United States Army soldiers and Italian prisoners of war (POW)
- Outcome: 1 Italian POW killed 28 U.S. soldiers convicted and imprisoned

The Fort Lawton riot refers to a series of events in August 1944 starting with a violent conflict between U.S. soldiers and Italian prisoners of war at Fort Lawton in Seattle, Washington during World War II. After the riot, prisoner Guglielmo Olivotto was found dead. (Note: Some resources spell his name Guglieamo Olivotto.) This led to the court-martial of 43 soldiers, all of them African Americans.

In 2005, the book On American Soil helped to convince the U.S. Army Board for Correction of Military Records that prosecutor Leon Jaworski had committed "egregious error," and that all convictions should be reversed. President George W. Bush signed legislation allowing the Army to disburse back pay to the defendants or their survivors.

== Riot ==
The night of August 14, 1944, an African-American port company at Fort Lawton, Seattle was under orders to ship out to the war zone the next morning. Just after 11 p.m, an intoxicated Black soldier and his three companions crossed paths with three Italian prisoners of war. Words were exchanged, the Black soldier rushed forward, and with one punch, an Italian knocked the American out cold.

The Italians retreated to adjacent barracks, but the call went out about the confrontation. A number of Black soldiers, including Pvt. Samuel Snow, ran after the Italians, wielding boards from a fence that they broke down. The Italians, who were in their bunks for the night, heard rocks and bricks being thrown against their windows in their dark quarters. Believing they were under attack, the Italians began running, with some jumping out of windows. In the melee, both Italians and United States soldiers were injured. Hearing the commotion, and responding to a 'whistle' calling them to defend their fellow soldiers, dozens of Black soldiers came out of their barracks. A false rumor began that one American was dead. Dozens of Black soldiers headed into the Italian area, armed with rocks, fence posts, and a couple of knives.

Private Clyde Lomax, a white member of the Military Police Corps, was responsible for patrolling the area known as the "Colored Area," and was on the scene almost immediately. He loaded the most severely injured American into his jeep, but delayed transporting him to the hospital. Lomax failed to request back up from fellow MPs or to notify the chain of command of the severity of the situation.

More than forty minutes passed before a contingent of MPs arrived. By then, dozens of men were injured. The most seriously injured were all Italian prisoners-of-war; they were transported to hospitals for treatment. One Italian spent 16 months recovering from his injuries.

The military policemen restored order without taking anyone into custody. Later, they claimed it had been too dark to identify any of the participants in the riot. The next morning, Lomax, accompanied by a Black MP, discovered the body of prisoner Guglielmo Olivotto, hanging from a noose on the obstacle course.

== Investigation ==
By sunset on the day Olivotto's body was discovered, Colonel Harry Branson, Fort Lawton's commanding officer, had ordered all evidence destroyed. No fingerprints were secured, no footprints saved, no weapons properly catalogued. When Branson tried to ship the black soldiers to San Francisco that same day, he was countermanded after a subordinate reported his actions to the Pentagon.

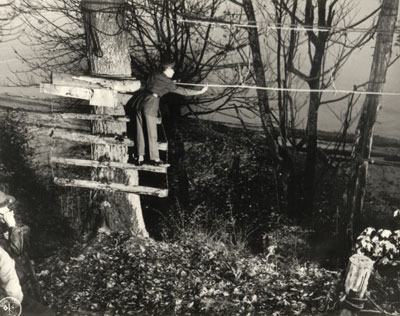
Staff Sergeant Charles M. Robinson at the site of Guglielmo Olivotto lynching, 1944

The riot and lynching was front page news in Seattle, and became a major story across the United States. The United States Army sent a prosecutor, Leon Jaworski of Houston, to conduct a two-month investigation. During weeks of interrogations, Jaworski's investigators offered immunity to several soldiers who would agree to testify. Most refused, including Samuel Snow and Roy Montgomery. Five black soldiers agreed, however, to testify for the prosecution in exchange for immunity. Six decades later, all five were said to have had unrelated grudges against many of the men they accused.

Most Italian prisoners-of-war were unable to identify a single black soldier, citing the darkness and confusion. Two, however, offered confident identifications of dozens of the Americans, and Jaworski used those two as his main witnesses. Decades later, a review of the case found that both had been previously identified as unreliable security risks by officers of the Military Intelligence Corps.

As reports of the riot and lynching reached the Pentagon, General Elliot Cooke was sent to Seattle, charged with determining who, if anyone, had failed to prevent the riot and lynching. Cooke conducted an investigation before Jaworski had arrived. Cooke was not responsible for helping Jaworski with the criminal investigation, but Jaworski was given access to all of Cooke's interrogations and conclusions.

In a classified report to Virgil L. Peterson, the Inspector General, Cooke concluded that the Fort Lawton commander had botched the initial criminal investigation, recommended Branson's demotion and/or reassignment, and ordered that Private Lomax be court-martialed for abandoning his post during the riot and lynching.

== Defense ==
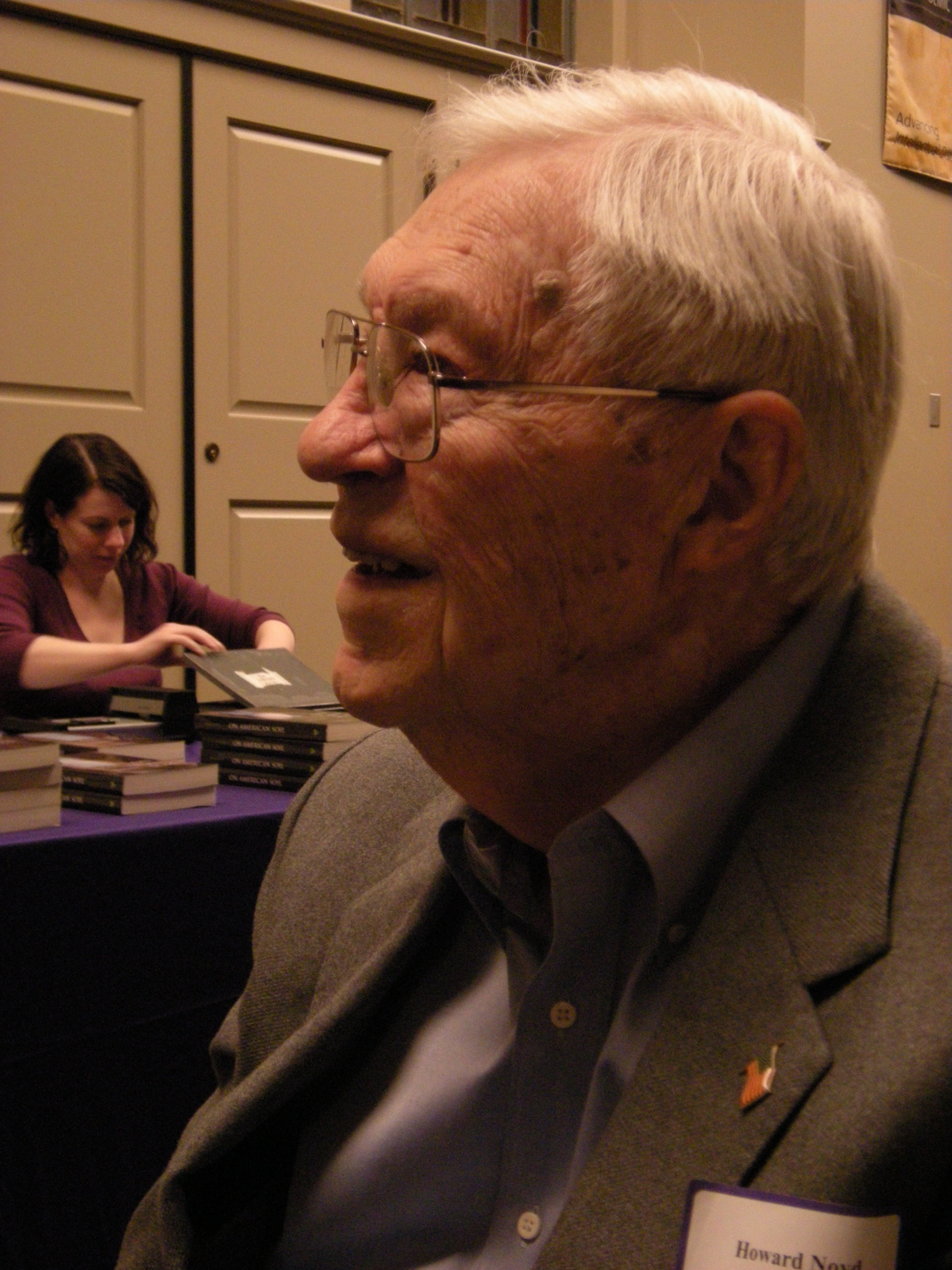
Howard Noyd (2009)

After weeks of investigation, Jaworski decided to charge 43 soldiers with rioting; all the suspects were African American and charged with a crime with a maximum penalty of life imprisonment. Three of the men – Luther Larkin (1921–1948), Arthur Hurks (1921–1991) and William Jones (1924–1992) – were also charged with premeditated murder. They faced a possible death sentence. This was the largest number of defendants in a single United States Army trial during World War II.

The defendants were provided two lawyers to represent them, and they were given 10 days to prepare their cases. William T. Beeks, the lead defense attorney, later was appointed as a federal judge. He was assisted by Howard Noyd, a former football player from Iowa.

Without much time, the defense lawyers decided to concentrate on trying to save their clients from the first-degree murder charges.

== Trial ==
The nine-member court-martial, all white officers, convened on November 16, 1944. Trial was held six days a week and all day on Thanksgiving.

On December 8, 1944, Beeks discovered for the first time that Jaworski had gained access to General Cooke's lengthy confidential report. Citing concerns about wartime security, Jaworski repeatedly refused to give the report to the defense, despite a prosecutorial obligation to do so. The court refused to intervene. Beeks never learned about Cooke's criticism of Branson, Lomax and others, information which would likely have discredited most of Jaworski's main witnesses. Jaworski called Lomax to testify against the black soldiers.

== Verdicts ==
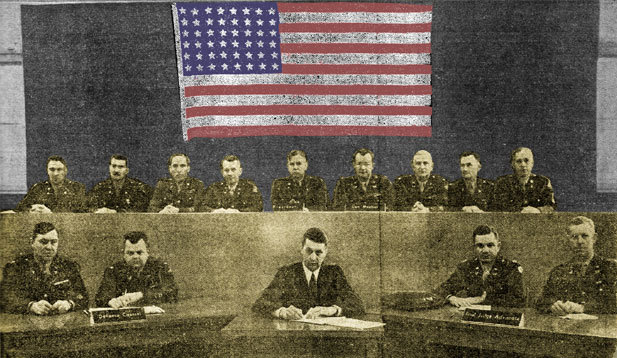
Members of the Fort Lawton Court Martial Panel (top) with Judge Advocate General Corps defense (bottom left) and prosecution lawyers (bottom right) and stenographer (bottom center).

After five weeks in what was the longest United States Army court-martial of World War II, the court found 28 of the 43 defendants guilty of rioting. They found two: Luther Larkin and William Jones, guilty of manslaughter. Sentences ranged from six months to 25 years at penal labour. All but one defendant were issued dishonorable discharges at the completion of their prison sentences.

Because it was a capital case, an automatic appeal was sent to the U.S. Army's Board of Review. The appeals were rejected without elaboration.

In 1945, at the end of World War II, President Harry Truman was eager to establish a reputation of being helpful to veterans. He began issuing annual "Christmas clemencies", reducing the sentences of thousands of soldiers, including the Fort Lawton defendants. By 1949, the last Fort Lawton defendant left prison.

== Investigative journalism ==
In 1986, journalist Jack Hamann found Guglielmo Olivotto's headstone in the Fort Lawton cemetery. Hamann undertook months of research, most of it relying on secondary sources, and produced a special one-hour documentary program for Seattle's NBC affiliate, KING-TV. The program raised some questions about the prosecution, but did not offer any substantial evidence to refute Jaworski's case. It won an Emmy Award.

In 2001, Hamann and his wife, Leslie Hamann, began a four-year effort to locate primary sources, including documents and witnesses. During several weeks of research at the National Archives in College Park, Maryland, the Hamanns came across General Cooke's newly declassified report. The revelations in that report became the basis for their book, On American Soil: How Justice Became a Casualty of World War II. In 2006, Investigative Reporters and Editors, Inc. (IRE) named On American Soil the nation's best investigative book of the year.

== U.S. Congress ==
On July 1, 2005, U.S. Rep Jim McDermott (D-WA) introduced HR 3174, a bill demanding that the United States Army reopen the Fort Lawton case, based on the allegations made in On American Soil. The bill, with dozens of co-sponsors, remained in the House Armed Services Committee until the chairman of that committee, U.S. Rep. Duncan Hunter (R-CA) received a letter from constituent Julianna Hamann, mother of author Jack Hamann. After committee staff vetted the book, Rep. McDermott and Rep. Hunter agreed on June 8, 2006, to exercise a Congressional privilege allowing them to insist that the U.S. Army Board for Correction of Military Records (ABCMR) review the convictions.

== U.S. Army Board for Correction of Military Records ==
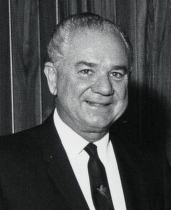
Leon Jaworski

On October 26, 2007, the ABCMR ruled unanimously that Leon Jaworski had committed "egregious error" in his prosecution of the Fort Lawton case, particularly by refusing to make the Cooke Report available to the defense. The board, calling the trial "fundamentally unfair", overturned the convictions. They ordered that defendants be issued retroactive honorable discharges. In addition, the surviving defendants – or the estates of those who have since died – were deemed entitled to "all rights, privileges and property lost as a result of the convictions", including "all due pay and allowances".

== $725 check ==
On November 29, 2007, Samuel Snow received a check for $725. An army spokesman explained that the Board's order was so unusual and sweeping that army regulations contained no provision for payment of interest in such cases. The small checks received by Snow and by the families of other Fort Lawton veterans resulted in stories about the supposed unfairness and inadequacy of the regulations.

On January 23, 2008, Rep. Jim McDermott introduced HR 5130 in the House, authorizing the U.S. Army to pay interest on the Fort Lawton awards. Sen. Bill Nelson (D-FL) introduced companion bill S 2548 in the Senate. The bills were approved by the Armed Services Committees of both houses, and were supported by testimony from Secretary of the Army Pete Geren. He described Snow's small check as "a travesty of justice."

On October 14, 2008, President George W. Bush signed the Duncan Hunter National Defense Authorization Act for FY 2009. The bill included the legislation authorizing the Army to add tens of thousands of dollars interest to the back pay due to the Fort Lawton veterans.

== Tribute ==
By the summer of 2008, the army had located two living defendants (Samuel Snow of Florida and Roy Montgomery of Illinois), plus the families of ten others who had since died. King County Executive Ron Sims and Seattle Mayor Greg Nickels organized a tribute to the Fort Lawton defendants and surviving families. It featured a dinner, a parade, a formal military ceremony, and a Catholic mass honoring the memory of Guglielmo Olivotto. At the military ceremony, Assistant Army Secretary Ronald James offered a tribute to the wrongly convicted men, including an apology and the presentation of belated honorable discharges.

=== Samuel Snow ===
During the morning of the Seattle military ceremony, Samuel Snow became ill. Hours later, his family brought his honorable discharge to his hospital bedside, where he held it to his chest and smiled broadly. That same evening, he died of heart failure, with his wife and son at his side.

Snow's death was worldwide news. His funeral in Leesburg, Florida, drew hundreds of mourners; he received a burial with full military honors.

=== Roy Montgomery ===
Roy Montgomery did not attend the Seattle ceremony, so Assistant Army Secretary Ronald James went to his home in Illinois to present a personal apology and hand-deliver his back pay. Montgomery responded, "This is a great satisfaction. Now I can forget about the whole thing. That's all I ever wanted to do." On December 6, 2012, Roy Laine Montgomery died at the age of 91, survived by a daughter, three grandsons and numerous great-grandchildren.

== See also ==
- Port Chicago disaster – 1944 court-martial of 50 African-American Navy men for refusing unsafe munitions loading work following a deadly explosion.
- Agana race riot – December 1944 conflict between African-American sailors and white Marines in Guam.
- George N. Crocker – part of the court-martial resulting from the riot.
- African-American mutinies in the United States Armed Forces
