= List of critics of the New Deal =

Critics of the New Deal include:

== From the right (conservatives, libertarians, etc.) ==
=== Politicians ===
- John Nance Garner, supported Roosevelt in 1932; elected vice president 1932 and 1936; broke with Roosevelt in 1937 over his court packing plan.
- Carter Glass, senator from Virginia, came from his deathbed to the 1940 Democratic Convention to nominate Franklin Roosevelt's campaign manager James Farley as the Democratic Party's candidate for the presidency. Glass was against Roosevelt's third term candidacy.
- William Randolph Hearst, former leader of left-wing of Democratic Party; owned nation's largest newspaper chain; major supporter of Roosevelt in 1932, broke with Roosevelt in 1935 over Roosevelt's proposal to greatly increase taxes on the inheritances of the wealthy, and to close several tax loopholes used by the wealthy to avoid paying taxes.
- Hugh S. Johnson, first head of the National Recovery Administration (see ). Johnson fell out with Roosevelt after Roosevelt fired him in 1935.
- George N. Peek, farm leader; supported Roosevelt in 1932
- Al Smith, Democratic nominee for U.S. president in 1928; founded American Liberty League in 1934 to attack New Deal programs as fostering unnecessary "class conflict".
- Rush D. Holt, Sr., Democratic West Virginian senator; opposed Roosevelt's domestic and foreign policies.
- Robert A. Taft, powerful Republican senator from Ohio from 1939 to 1953. Taft was the leader of the Republican Party's conservative wing; he consistently denounced the New Deal as "socialism" and argued that it harmed America's business interests and gave ever-greater control to the central government in Washington. Before the Japanese attack on Pearl Harbor Taft, a non-interventionist, vigorously opposed Roosevelt's attempts to aid Britain in World War II.
- Ronald Reagan, Hollywood film actor; strong New Dealer in 1940s; started opposing New Deal programs in the 1950s as a spokesman for the General Electric company; would later become President of the United States in 1980.
- Barry Goldwater, Republican senator from Arizona from 1953 to 1965 and 1969 to 1987; Republican nominee for U.S. president in 1964
- Herbert Hoover
- Lou Henry Hoover
- Lewis Douglas, Budget Director, 1933
- Harry F. Byrd, Democratic senator from Virginia
- Frank Knox, Republican vice presidential candidate in 1936; joined Roosevelt's cabinet as Secretary of the Navy, 1940–44
- Henry Stimson, Hoover's Secretary of State; joined Roosevelt's cabinet as Secretary of War, 1940–45
- Wendell Willkie, Republican presidential candidate in 1940; supported Roosevelt 1941–43
- Ellison D. Smith, Democratic senator from North Carolina, Roosevelt tried to defeat him for reelection 1938.

=== Writers and speakers ===
- Maxwell Anderson, playwright, American libertarian, wrote Knickerbocker Holiday (with Kurt Weill) as a satire on the New Deal which compared Roosevelt to Hitler and Mussolini.
- Charles Coughlin, Irish-American Catholic priest with huge radio audience; anti-communist, originally on the left and a Roosevelt supporter in 1932 but by 1935 Coughlin "excoriated Roosevelt as 'anti-God'". Charles Coughlin denounced Roosevelt as too moderate and demanded stronger measures against "capitalism" which he associated with "Jews".
- Elizabeth Dilling, anti-communist activist, author of The Roosevelt Red Record and Its Background (1936)
- John Dos Passos, novelist; formerly on the left
- John T. Flynn, journalist, author of The Roosevelt Myth; formerly on the left
- Milton Friedman, economist. A spokesman for the Treasury during World War II; while supportive of relief and employment efforts and expansive monetary policy under the New Deal, Friedman was also critical of the National Recovery Administration.
- Robert Frost, poet
- Garet Garrett, editorial writer for Saturday Evening Post
- Henry Hazlitt, writer
- Zora Neale Hurston, novelist
- Robinson Jeffers, poet and playwright
- Alice Lee Jemison, Native American rights advocate
- Rose Wilder Lane, novelist and journalist
- David Lawrence, magazine columnist
- Walter Lippmann newspaper columnist and political philosopher
- H.L. Mencken, American journalist, essayist, magazine editor
- Raymond Moley, former top Brain Truster
- Albert Jay Nock, libertarian author and social critic
- Isabel Paterson, libertarian author
- Westbrook Pegler newspaper columnist
- Frank Capra, film director, producer, and screenwriter
- Ezra Pound, American poet and expatriate; radio broadcaster for Italian leader Benito Mussolini in World War II
- Ayn Rand novelist, founder of Objectivism and one inspiration for libertarianism.
- John R. Rice, Protestant fundamentalist writer.
- Gerald L. K. Smith, Huey Long second-in-command; took over "SOWM" after Long's death, went in pro-Fascist direction and joined the Silver Legion of America.
- Gertrude Stein, novelist, poet, playwright
- Mark Sullivan, newspaper columnist
- James True
- DeWitt Wallace, journalist and publisher of Reader's Digest

== From the left (liberals to far left) ==
- Mary van Kleeck, American social feminist, labor activist, and social scientist
- Huey Long, governor and senator from Louisiana; supported Roosevelt in 1932; broke and was setting up a presidential campaign on the left in 1936, but was assassinated in 1935.
- William Lemke, North Dakota, picked up Huey Long support in 1936
- Norman Thomas, frequent presidential candidate on the socialist ticket. Disagreed with Roosevelt's economic theory.
- John L. Lewis, leader of mine workers and CIO; strong supporter of Roosevelt in 1936; in opposition 1940 because of Roosevelt's foreign-policy opposing Germany
- Howard Zinn, Historian and Socialist activist; describes New Deal as a cautious, limited reform that saved Capitalism rather than fundamentally transforming it - due to the treat of a potential Socialist revolution rather than pure altruism in his book 'A People's History of the United States'.
- Noam Chomsky, Linguist and Political activist - views Roosevelt as a Conservative who initially wanted to balance the federal budget and only adopted progressive policies after being peer pressured by labor movements.

== Organizations ==
- American Liberty League (1934–1940)
- Conservative coalition (unofficial alliance) (1938–1994)

== Books with an anti-New Deal point of view ==
- Alfred M. Bingham & Selden Rodman, editors, Challenge to the New Deal (1934)
- Elizabeth Dilling, The Red Network (1934)
- Elizabeth Dilling, The Roosevelt Red Record and Its Background (1936)
- Herbert Hoover, Addresses Upon the American Road, 1933–1938 (1938)
- Raymond Moley, After Seven Years (1939)
- Herbert Hoover, Addresses Upon the American Road, 1940–1941 (1941)
- Thomas Jefferson Coolidge, Why Centralized Government (1941)
- John T. Flynn, The Roosevelt Myth (1948, revised 1952)
- Garet Garrett, The People's Pottage (1951, later republished as Burden of Empire and Ex America)
- Murray Rothbard, America's Great Depression (1963)
- James J. Martin, American Liberalism and World Politics, 1931–1941 (1964)
- Gary Dean Best, Pride, Prejudice, and Politics: Roosevelt Versus Recovery, 1933-1938 (1990)
- Garet Garrett, Salvos Against the New Deal: Selections from the Saturday Evening Post, 1933–1940 (2002), edited by Bruce Ramsey
- Thomas Fleming, The New Dealers' War: FDR and the War Within World War II (2002)
- Garet Garrett, Defend America First: The Antiwar Editorials of the Saturday Evening Post, 1939–1942 (2003), edited by Bruce Ramsey
- Jim Powell, FDR's Folly: How Roosevelt and His New Deal Prolonged the Great Depression (2003)
- Gene Smiley, Rethinking the Great Depression (2003)
- Thomas Woods, The Politically Incorrect Guide to American History (2004)
- Robert P. Murphy, The Politically Incorrect Guide to Capitalism (2007)
- Amity Shlaes, The Forgotten Man: A New History of the Great Depression (2007)
- Jonah Goldberg, Liberal Fascism: The Secret History of the American Left, from Mussolini to the Politics of Meaning (2008)
- Burton W. Folsom, Jr., New Deal or Raw Deal?: How FDR's Economic Legacy Has Damaged America (2008)
- Robert P. Murphy, The Politically Incorrect Guide to the Great Depression and the New Deal (2009)
- George Selgin, False Dawn: The New Deal and the Promise of Recovery, 1933-1947 (2025)
- David T. Beito, FDR: A New Political Life (2025)

== See also ==
- Old Right (United States)

== Other references ==
- Best, Gary Dean (1993). The Critical Press and the New Deal: The Press Versus Presidential Power, 1933–1938. Praeger Publishers. Archived from the original on 2012-10-15 – via Questia.
- Brinkley, Alan. Voices of Protest: Huey Long, Father Coughlin, & the Great Depression (1983)
- Graham, Otis L. and Meghan Robinson Wander, eds. Franklin D. Roosevelt: His Life and Times. (1985), an encyclopedia
- Kennedy, David M. (1999). Freedom From Fear: The American People in Depression and War, 1929–1945. Archived from the original on 2012-09-30 – via Questia.
- Carl McCarthy. The Great Wisconsin Brainwash (1954)
- McCoy, Donald R. (1966). Landon of Kansas. Archived from the original on 2012-10-15 – via Questia.
- Paterson, James. Mr. Republican: A Biography of Robert Taft (1972), standard biography
- Ronald Radosh. Prophets on the Right: Profiles of conservative critics of American globalism (1978)
- Rudolf, Frederick. "The American Liberty League, 1934–1940," American Historical Review, LVI (October 1950), 19–33 online at JSTOR
- Schlesinger, Arthur M. Jr., The Age of Roosevelt, 3 vols, (1957–1960), the classic pro-New Deal history, with details on critics. Online at vol 2 vol 3
- Smith, Richard Norton. An Uncommon Man: The Triumph of Herbert Hoover (1987) biography
- White, Graham J. FDR and the Press. 1979
- Winfield, Betty Houchin. FDR and the News Media 1990
- Williams, T. Harry. Huey Long (1969), Pulitzer Prize biography
- Wolfskill, George. The Revolt of the Conservatives: A History of the American Liberty League, 1934–1940 (1962)
