= Mario J. Rizzo =

American economist

Academic background
- Education: University of Chicago

Academic work
- Institutions: New York University
- Notable students: Robert P. Murphy

Mario J. Rizzo (/ˈrɪzoʊ/; born July 6, 1948) is an American economist of the Austrian School. He serves as Professor of Economics at New York University.

== Early life ==
Rizzo studied economics at Fordham University where he received his B.A. and M.A. As a student, he was then known as a follower of Murray Rothbard. He received his PhD in economics from the University of Chicago.

== Career ==
Rizzo is the Director of the Program on the Foundations of the Market Economy. He co-directs the Classical Liberal Institute at the New York University School of Law with Richard Epstein. He was the 1997-1998 president of the Society for the Development of Austrian Economics and the 2017-2018 Hayek Distinguished Visiting Professor for the F. A. Hayek Program for Advanced Study in Philosophy, Politics, and Economics at the Mercatus Center, George Mason University. He edits the Routledge book series Foundations of the Market Economy with Laurence H. White. His works lies at the interface between ethics and economics, law and economics, and psychology and economics. Jeffrey Tucker describes Rizzo's work as having a huge influence on his early thought and argues that his major work, Austrian Economics Re-examined, launched a research program that has lasted for decades. Peter Boettke describes the critical role of Rizzo's research program in his early work on the economics of socialism.

In 2016, Rizzo was noted for being the only professional economist to sign open letters condemning both the economic policy platforms of Donald Trump and Hillary Clinton.

== Publications ==
=== Selected books ===
- Rizzo, Mario J.; Cowan, Robin (Eds.). (1995). Profits and morality. University of Chicago Press. ISBN 9780226116327
- Rizzo, Mario J.; O'Driscoll Jr, Gerald P. (2015). Austrian Economics Re-Examined: The Economics of Time and Ignorance. Routledge. ISBN 9781138023000
- Rizzo, Mario J.; Whitman, Glen (2020). Escaping Paternalism: Rationality, Behavioral Economics, and Public Policy. Cambridge University Press. ISBN 9781108760003

=== Selected articles ===
- Rizzo, Mario J. (1982). "A Theory of Economic Loss in the Law of Torts." The Journal of Legal Studies: 281–310.
- Rizzo, Mario J. (1990). "Hayek's four tendencies toward equilibrium." Cultural Dynamics: 12–31.
- Rizzo, Mario J. (2005). "The problem of moral dirigisme: a new argument against moralistic legislation." NYUJL & Liberty: 790–844.
- Rizzo, Mario J. (2015). "Abstract morality for an abstract order: Liberalism’s difficult problem." Supreme Court Economic Review: 7-34.
