= Jack Hamann =

American film producer

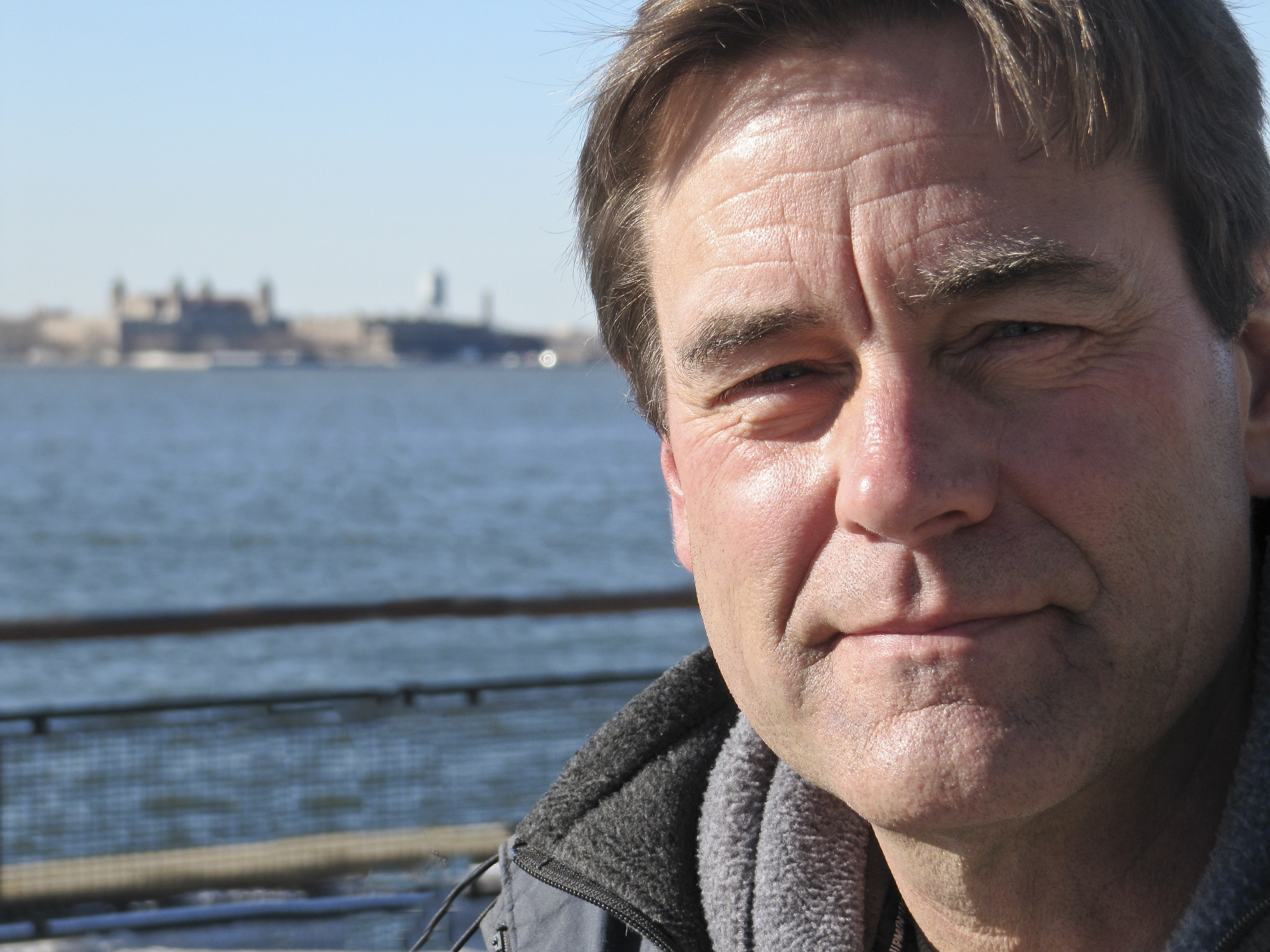
- Author Jack Hamann in New York City
- Born: November 9, 1954 (age 71)
- Occupations: television correspondent, documentary producer, and author

Jack Hamann (born November 9, 1954) is an American television correspondent, documentary producer, and author.

== Work ==
His 2005 book On American Soil investigated the August 1944 killing of Italian prisoner of war Guglielmo Olivotto at Fort Lawton in Seattle, Washington, and concludes that the resulting military trial—in which Leon Jaworski was the lead prosecutor—was a miscarriage of justice. Whereas Hamann's own 1987 documentary on the subject largely accepted the then-conventional view that Olivotto had been lynched by African-American soldiers, the book went back to primary sources and heavily revised this view. The book led to a congressional review and ultimately the voiding of the court-martial of those soldiers.

Hamann reported for KING-TV from 1983 to 1990. He also worked for CNN and PBS, and won ten regional Emmy Awards.

== Bibliography ==
- On American Soil: How Justice Became a Casualty of World War II. Algonquin Books of Chapel Hill. 2005. ISBN 1565123948. OCLC 234195158.

== See also ==
- Fort Lawton Riot
