= Bob Murphy (economist) =

American economist of the Austrian school

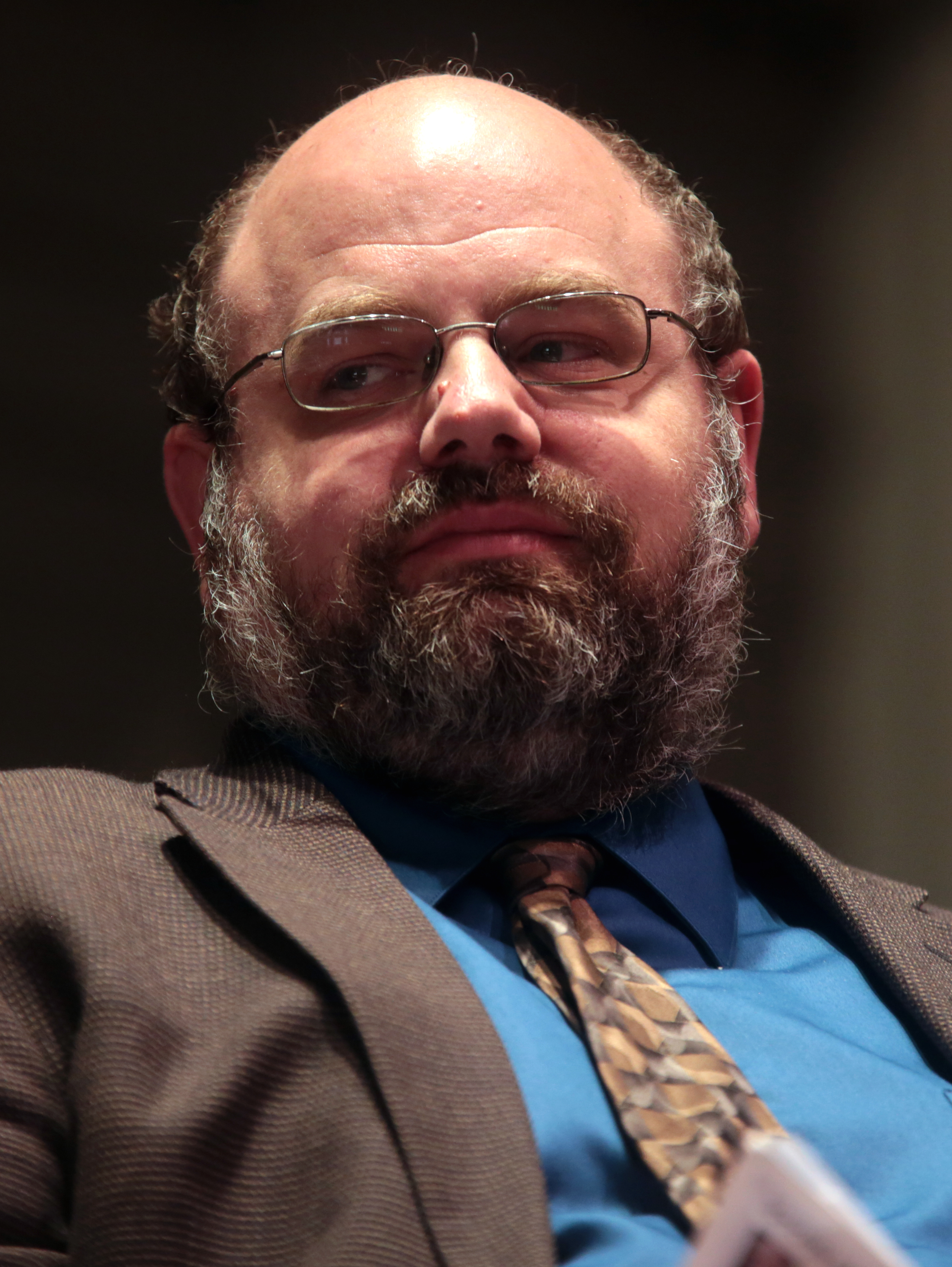
- Murphy at the 2017 Mises Circle
- Born: May 23, 1976 (age 50)

Academic background
- Education: Hillsdale College (B.A., 1998); New York University (Ph.D, 2003)
- Thesis: Unanticipated Intertemporal Change in Theories of Interest (2003)
- Doctoral advisor: Mario Rizzo
- Influences: Rothbard; Mises; Bawerk; Hayek; Hoppe; Menger; Hazlitt; Fetter; Kirzner; Lachmann; Block; Hülsmann; Rizzo; Bastiat; Ebeling; Friedman; Knight; Sowell; Williams; Feynman

Academic work
- Discipline: Monetary economics; Financial economics; Political economy; Law and economics; Energy economics
- School or tradition: Austrian school
- Institutions: Mises Institute (2003-present); Hillsdale College (2003-2006); New York University (2006); Laffer Associates (2006-2007); Pacific Research Institute (2007-2011); Institute for Energy Research (2007-2020); Independent Institute (2011–present); Fraser Institute (2013-present); Free Market Institute at Texas Tech University (2015-2019) infineo (2022-present)
- Website: consultingbyrpm.com bobmurphyshow.com

Robert Patrick Murphy (born May 23, 1976) is an American economist. Murphy is research assistant professor with the Free Market Institute at Texas Tech University. He has been affiliated with Laffer Associates, the Pacific Research Institute, the Institute for Energy Research (IER), the Independent Institute, the Ludwig von Mises Institute, and the Fraser Institute.

== Education ==
Murphy received a BA in economics at Hillsdale College in 1998 and a Ph.D. in economics at New York University in 2003.

== Career ==
Murphy is research assistant professor with the Free Market Institute at Texas Tech University. He has been a visiting assistant professor at Hillsdale College, and a visiting scholar at New York University. He has been affiliated with Laffer Associates, the Pacific Research Institute, the Institute for Energy Research (IER) as the senior economist focusing on climate change, the Independent Institute, the Ludwig von Mises Institute, and the Fraser Institute in Canada.

Murphy has written books such as Choice: Cooperation, Enterprise, and Human Action (Independent Institute, 2015), Primal Prescription with Doug McGuff, MD regarding healthcare in the United States, and Lessons for the Young Economist (Mises Institute 2010). He has written study guides to works of Ludwig von Mises and Murray Rothbard. Murphy authored the 2007 book The Politically Incorrect Guide to Capitalism. Murphy's book, The Politically Incorrect Guide to the Great Depression and the New Deal, published in 2009, blamed the Depression on government policies.

Murphy has been criticized by economists Brad DeLong and Paul Krugman for predicting that the quantitative easing practiced by the Federal Reserve in the late 2000s would create high inflation by 2013, which did not materialize by that time.

In 2013 Murphy challenged Krugman to a debate and unnamed supporters of Murphy promised to donate $100,000 to a charity if Krugman would debate Murphy on economic policy issues. A promotional website was established for the challenge. In response to a radio show caller, Krugman rejected the proposed debate, saying that the subject “is not something to be settled by public circuses". (Note: Exchange occurs at the 20:30 mark in the episode.)

=== Environmental policy ===
Murphy has stated related to climate change that, "Many economists favor some form of government penalty on CO2 emissions because of the threat of climate change. However, the steps in the argument—going from computer simulations to a specific, numerical tax on economic activity today—are riddled with uncertainties".

Murphy has additionally been quoted as saying, "Given the large uncertainties at each major step of the case for reliance on a carbon tax, economists should reconsider their current support for such a policy".

Additionally, Murphy has been quoted as stating, "I reject the peak oil theory insofar as it refers to technological limits on human ingenuity".

== Religious views ==
Murphy is a Christian and has stated in his writings that "my ethical beliefs are informed by my Christian faith, and I am a firm believer in natural law".

== Publications ==
- (2002) Chaos Theory: Two Essays on Market Anarchism [PDF Available]
- (2005) Home Study Course in Austrian Economics
- (2006) Study Guide to Man, Economy, and State with Power and Market [PDF Available]
- (2007) The Politically Incorrect Guide to Capitalism
- (2008) Study Guide to Human Action [PDF Available]
- (2009) The Sizzle of Economic Freedom: How Economic Freedom Helps You and Why You Should Demand More [PDF Available]
- (2009) The Politically Incorrect Guide to the Great Depression and the New Deal
- (2010) How Privatized Banking Really Works: Integrating Austrian Economics with the Infinite Banking Concept
- (2010) Lessons for the Young Economist [PDF Available]
- (2011) Study Guide to The Theory of Money and Credit [PDF Available]
- (2012) Lessons for the Young Economist: Teacher's Manual [PDF Available]
- (2013) The Three Lads and the Lizard King
- (2014) Economic Principles for Prosperity [PDF Available]
- (2015) Choice: Cooperation, Enterprise, and Human Action
- (2015) The Primal Prescription: Surviving The "Sick Care" Sinkhole
- (2017) Understanding Bitcoin: The Liberty Lover’s Guide to the Mechanics & Economics of Crypto-Currencies [PDF Available]
- (2018) The Case for IBC: How to Secede from Our Current Money Regime One Household at a Time
- (2018) Contra Krugman: Smashing the Errors of America's Most Famous Keynesian
- (2021) Common Sense: The Case for an Independent Texas [PDF Available]
- (2021) Understanding Money Mechanics [PDF Available]
