= The Politically Incorrect Guide to Capitalism =

2007 book by Robert P. Murphy

- Cover of the first edition
- Author: Robert P. Murphy
- Language: English
- Series: The Politically Incorrect Guide
- Subjects: Economics, capitalism in the United States
- Published: 2007
- Publication place: United States
- Media type: Print
- Pages: 206
- ISBN: 978-1-59698-504-9
- OCLC: 79860752
- Dewey Decimal: 330.12/2
- LC Class: HB501 .M88 2007
- Preceded by: The Politically Incorrect Guide to Global Warming and Environmentalism
- Followed by: The Politically Incorrect Guide to the Constitution

The Politically Incorrect Guide to Capitalism is a 2007 book by Austrian school economist Robert P. Murphy. It is the ninth book in the Regnery Publishing The Politically Incorrect Guides (P.I.G.) series.

Written as a result of a poll by P.I.G. readers that stated a book on economics, The Politically Incorrect Guide to Capitalism aims to refute what it sees as common misconceptions resulting from Keynesian economics about what capitalism actually is.

The Politically Incorrect Guide to Capitalism argues against criticisms of capitalism, amongst which are:

- it causes ecological destruction
- it causes vast income inequality, as well as racism
- it causes an unpredictable boom and bust cycle

Instead, Murphy argues that they result from government efforts to regulate the free market that have the effect of distorting laissez-faire supply and demand that would encourage the most rational allocation of resources possible, as well as their conservation for future generations. For example, with endangered species such as rhinos it is argued that if they were freely traded those who used their parts would have a stake in maintaining supply and conservation would improve (page 49). It is likewise argued that antitrust laws are unnecessary and that the "robber barons" actually benefited the US' poor much more than any government aid has ever done.
