= Lee Eun-ji =

Lee Eun-ji (Korean: 이은지) may refer to:

- Lee Eun-ji (cyclist) (born 1989), South Korean cyclist
- Lee Eun-ji (entertainer) (born 1992), South Korean entertainer
- Lee Eun-ji (swimmer) (born 2006), South Korean swimmer

== See also ==
- Lee Ji-eun (Korean: 이지은)
