= Consequences of the attack on Pearl Harbor =

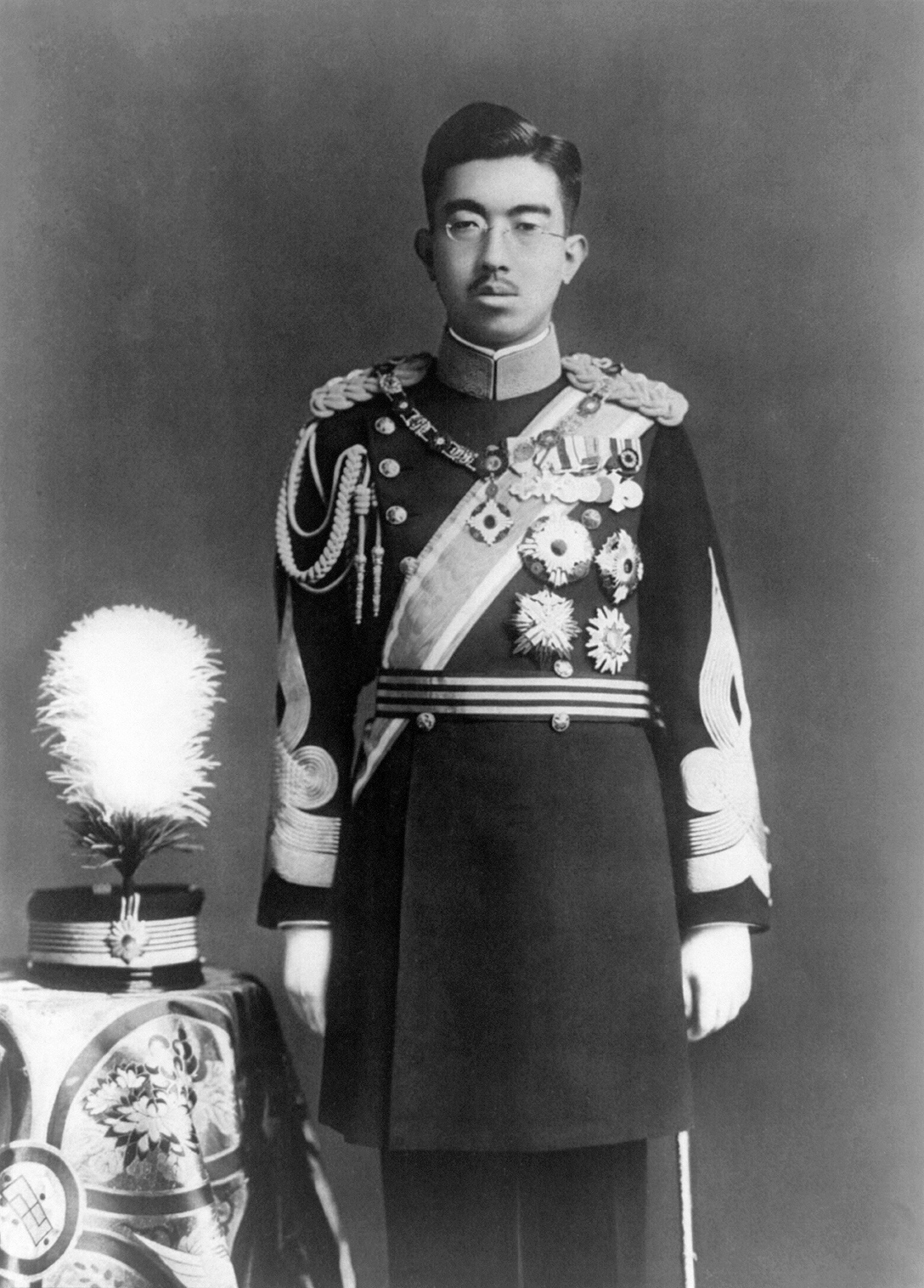
Hirohito, Emperor of Japan

Japan's attack on Pearl Harbor took place on December 7, 1941. The United States military suffered 19 ships damaged or sunk, and 2,403 people were killed. Its most significant consequence was the entrance of the United States into World War II. The US had previously been officially neutral and considered an isolationist country with its Neutrality Act but subsequently after the attack declared war on Japan the next day and entered the Pacific War. Then on December 11, 1941, four days after the Japanese attack, after the Italian declaration of war on the United States and the German declaration of war against the United States, which Hitler had orchestrated, the US was then at war with Germany and Italy. The US then became involved in the Battle of the Atlantic and the European theatre of war as well as with Japan.

Following the attack, the US interned 120,000 Japanese Americans, 11,000 German Americans, and 3,000 Italian Americans.

== American public opinion prior to the attack ==
From the outbreak of World War II on September 1, 1939, to December 6, 1941, the United States was officially neutral, as it was bound by the Neutrality Acts not to get involved in the conflicts raging in Europe and Asia. Before the attack on Pearl Harbor, public opinion in the United States had not been unanimous. When polled in January 1940, 60% of Americans were in favor of helping the United Kingdom in the war. A majority of Americans believed that the safety of the United States was contingent on the UK winning the war, and an even larger majority believed that the UK would lose the war if the United States stopped supplying war materials. Despite this, the same poll reported that 88% of Americans would not support entering the war against Germany and Italy. Public support for assisting the United Kingdom rose through 1940, reaching about 65% by May 1941. However, 80% disapproved of war against Germany and Italy. The only areas where most people favored formally going to war against Germany and Italy were a few western states and southern states. Over 50% of those polled in Wyoming said "yes" when asked if the United States should formally enter the war on Britain's side. The state of Tennessee, the Tennessee Valley region of North Alabama, all of Georgia and the regions of Western North Carolina, Eastern North Carolina, the South Carolina Lowcountry, the Pee Dee region of South Carolina and Upstate South Carolina were all considered "hot-beds of Anglophilic sentiment" before Pearl Harbor.

Americans were more unsure on the prospect of conflict with Empire of Japan around the same time frame. In a February Gallup poll, a majority believed that the United States should intervene in Japan's conquest of the Dutch East Indies and Singapore. However, in the same poll, only 39% supported going to war with Japan, while 46% opposed the prospect.

== American response ==
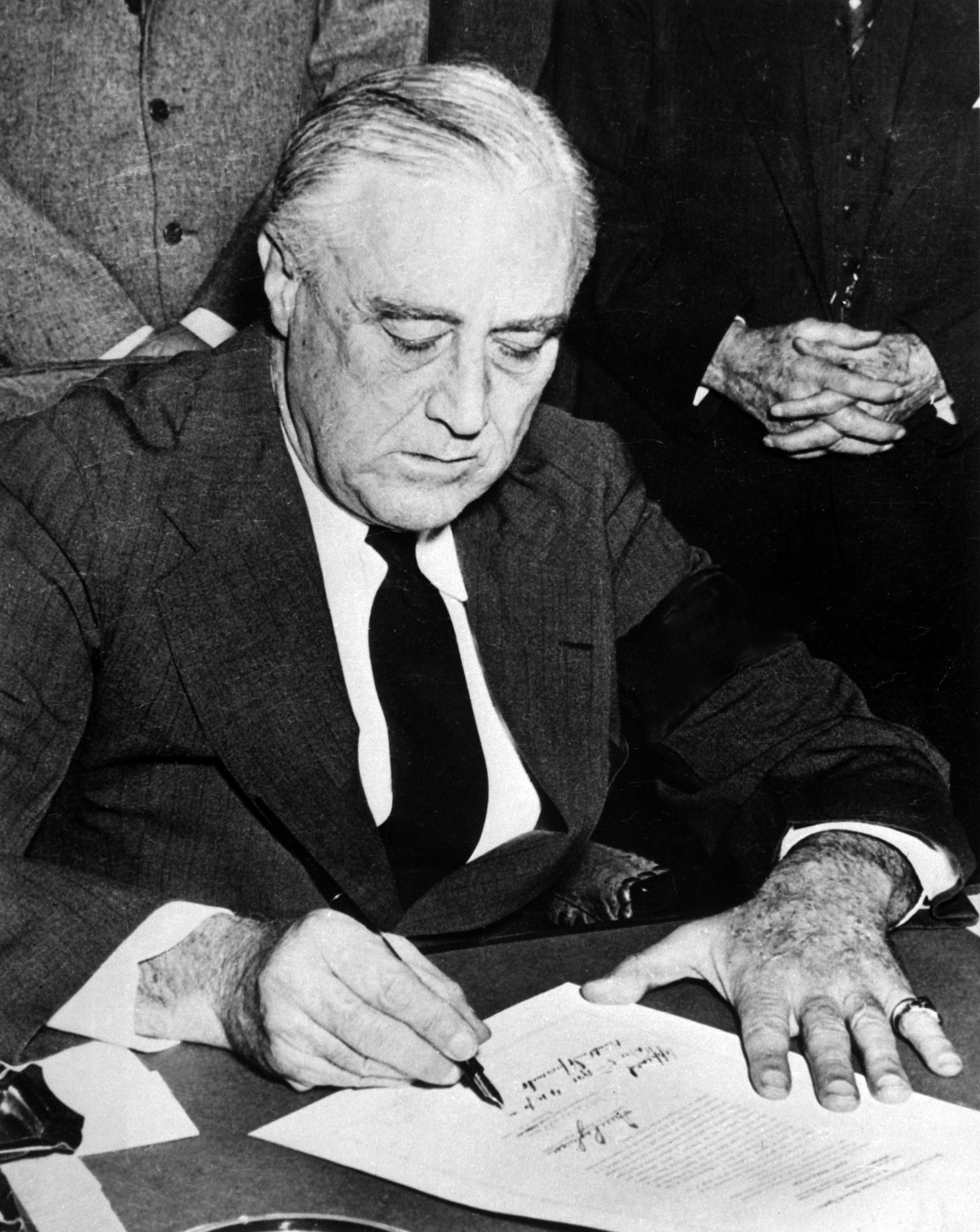
President Franklin D. Roosevelt signing the declaration of war against Japan on the day following the attack

On December 7, 1941, the Japanese launched a surprise attack on the U.S. naval base at Pearl Harbor. After two hours of bombing, 21 U.S. ships were sunk or damaged, 188 U.S. aircraft destroyed, and 2,403 people killed. All of this happened while the U.S. and Japan were officially engaging in diplomatic negotiations for possible peace in Asia.

The day after the attack, President Franklin D. Roosevelt addressed a joint session of the 77th United States Congress, calling December 7 "a date which will live in infamy". Within an hour of Roosevelt's speech, Congress declared war on the Empire of Japan amid outrage at the attack, the deaths of thousands of Americans, and Japan's deception of the United States by engaging in diplomatic talks during the entire event. Pacifist Representative Jeannette Rankin, a Republican from Montana, cast the only dissenting vote. Roosevelt signed the declaration of war later the same day. The United States government finished converting to a war economy, a process begun by provision of weapons and supplies to the Soviet Union and the British Empire. Japanese Americans from the West Coast were sent to internment camps for the duration of the war.

The attack on Pearl Harbor immediately united a divided nation. Public opinion had been moving towards support for entering the war during 1941, but considerable opposition remained until the attack. Overnight, Americans united against the Empire of Japan in response to calls to "Remember Pearl Harbor!" A poll taken between December 12–17, 1941, showed that 97% of respondents supported a declaration of war against Japan. Further polling showed a dramatic increase in support for every able-bodied man serving in the military, up to 70% in December 1941.

The attack also solidified public opinion against Germany, which was believed at the time to be responsible via inspiration or organization for the Pearl Harbor attack. A Gallup poll on December 10, 1941, a day before Germany declared war, found that 90% of respondents agreed with the question "Should President Roosevelt have asked Congress to declare war on Germany, as well as on Japan?" with 7% opposed. After the German declaration of war, the U.S. counter-declaration was unanimous.

American solidarity probably made possible the unconditional surrender position later taken by the Allies. Some historians, among them Samuel Eliot Morison, believe the attack doomed Imperial Japan to defeat simply because it had awakened the "sleeping giant", regardless of whether the fuel depots or machine shops had been destroyed or even if the carriers had been caught in port and sunk. America's industrial and military capacity, once mobilized, was able to pour overwhelming resources into both the Pacific and European theaters. Others, such as Clay Blair, Jr. and Mark Parillo believe Japanese trade protection was so incompetent that American submarines alone might have strangled Japan into defeat.

The closest friend Roosevelt had in the developing Allied alliance, Winston Churchill, stated that his first thought was that "We have won the war," very soon after Pearl Harbor was attacked.

Perceptions of treachery in the attack before a declaration of war sparked fears of sabotage or espionage by Japanese sympathizers residing in the U.S., including citizens of Japanese descent, and was a factor in the subsequent Japanese internment in the western United States. Other factors included misrepresentations of intelligence information suggesting sabotage, notably by General John L. DeWitt, commanding general of Western Defense Command on the Pacific Coast, who harbored personal feelings against Japanese Americans. In February 1942, Roosevelt signed United States Executive Order 9066, requiring all Japanese Americans to submit themselves for internment.

American propaganda made repeated use of the attack, because its effect was enormous and impossible to counter. "Remember Pearl Harbor!" became the watchwords of the war.

The American government understated the damage inflicted in the hope of preventing the Japanese from learning it, but the Japanese had, through surveillance, a good estimate.

Nationally known and controversial Detroit-area Catholic priest Charles Coughlin would oppose the country's entry into World War II even after the bombing of Pearl Harbor, alleging that Jews had planned the war for their own benefit and had conspired to involve the United States.

== Japanese views ==
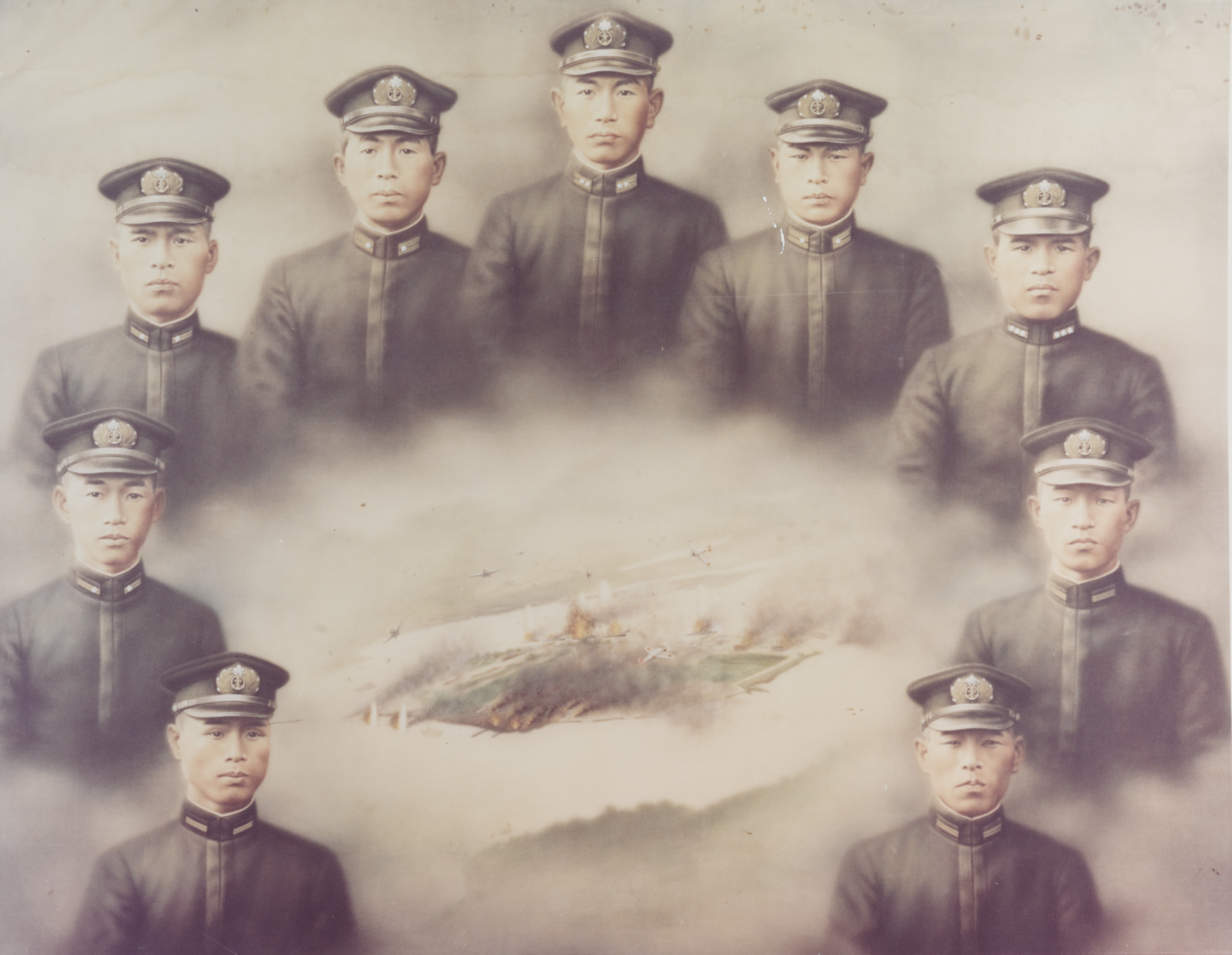
Japanese heroic depiction of nine submarine crewmembers lost during the attack, excluding the POW, Kazuo Sakamaki

On December 8, 1941, Japan declared war on the United States and the British Empire. The Japanese document discussed world peace and the disruptive actions of the United States and the United Kingdom. The document stated all avenues for averting war had been exhausted by the government of Japan.

Although the Imperial Japanese government had made some effort to prepare their population for war by anti-American propaganda, it appears most Japanese were surprised, apprehensive, and dismayed by the news they were now at war with the U.S., a country many of them admired. Nevertheless, the people at home and overseas thereafter generally accepted their government's account of the attack and supported the war effort until their nation's surrender in 1945.

Japan's national leadership at the time appeared to have believed war between the U.S. and Japan had long been inevitable. In any case, relations had already significantly deteriorated since Japan's invasion of China in the early 1930s, which the U.S. strongly disapproved of. In 1942, Saburō Kurusu, former Japanese ambassador to the United States, gave an address in which he talked about the "historical inevitability of the war of Greater East Asia." He said war had been a response to Washington's longstanding aggression toward Japan. Some of the provocations against Japan that he named were the San Francisco School incident, the Naval Limitations Treaty, other unequal treaties, the Nine Power Pact, and constant economic pressure, culminating in the "belligerent" scrap metal and oil embargo in 1941 by the United States and Allied countries to try to contain or reverse the actions of Japan, especially in Indochina, during her expansion of influence and interests throughout Asia.

Japan's dependence on imported oil made the trade embargoes especially significant. These pressures directly influenced Japan to ally with Germany and Italy through the Tripartite Pact. According to Kurusu, the actions showed that the Allies had already provoked war with Japan long before the attack at Pearl Harbor and that the U.S. was already preparing for war with Japan. Kurusu also stated that the U.S. was looking beyond just Asia to world domination, with "sinister designs". Some of that view seems to have been shared by Adolf Hitler, who called it one of the reasons Germany declared war on the United States. He had many years earlier mentioned European imperialism toward Japan. Therefore, according to Kurusu, Japan had no choice but to defend itself and so should rapidly continue to militarize, bring Germany and Italy closer as allies and militarily combat the United States, Britain, and the Netherlands.

Japan's leaders also saw themselves as justified in their conduct, believing that they were building the Greater East Asia Co-Prosperity Sphere. They also explained Japan had done everything possible to alleviate tension between the two nations. The decision to attack, at least for public presentation, was reluctant and forced on Japan. Of the Pearl Harbor attack itself, Kurusu said it came in direct response to a virtual ultimatum from the U.S. government, the Hull note, and so the surprise attack was not treacherous. Since the Japanese-American relationship already had hit its lowest point, there was no alternative. In any case, had an acceptable settlement of differences been reached, the Carrier Striking Task Force could have been called back.

== Germany and Italy declare war ==
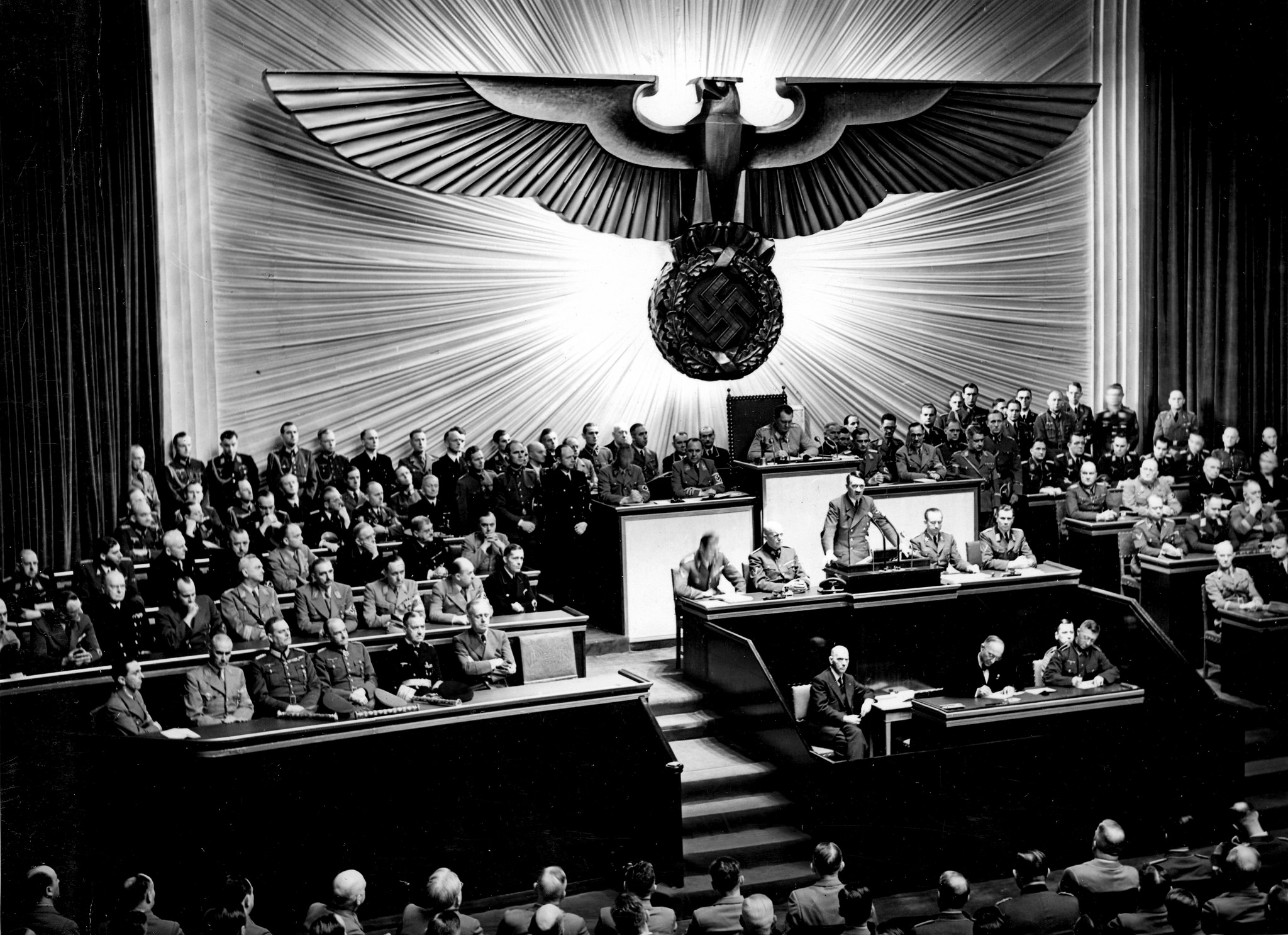
Hitler declares war against the United States in the Reichstag, December 11, 1941.

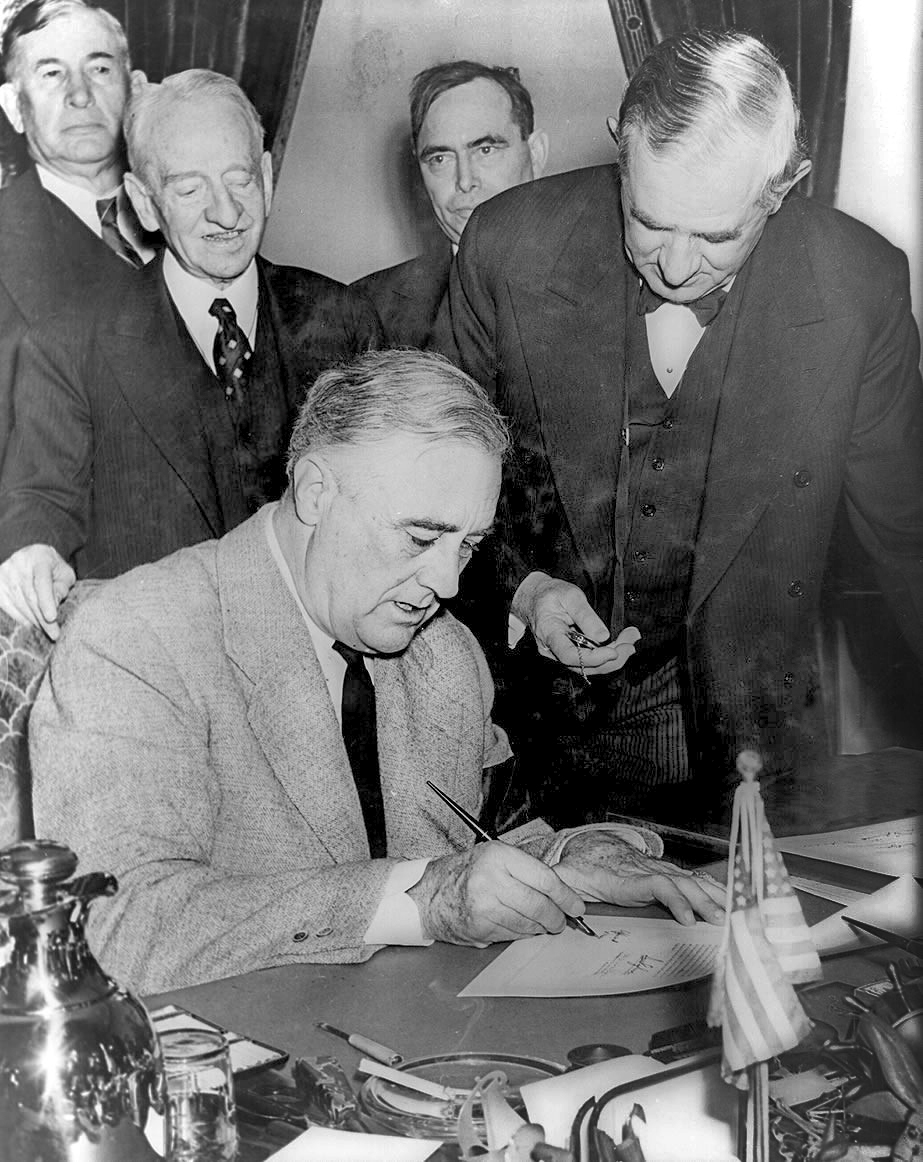
Franklin Roosevelt's signing of the declaration of war against Germany, December 11, 1941.

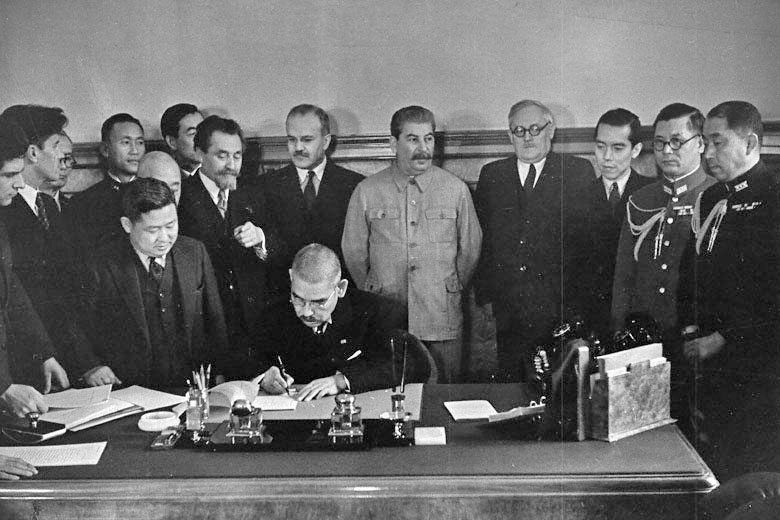
Yōsuke Matsuoka, Japan's foreign minister, signs the Soviet–Japanese Neutrality Pact in April 1941 following the German–Soviet Nonaggression Pact, a sign that Japan might not attack the Soviets to assist Hitler.

On December 11, Germany and Italy declared war on the United States, and the United States reciprocated, formally entering the war in Europe.

German dictator Adolf Hitler and Italian dictator Benito Mussolini were under no obligation to declare war on the United States under the mutual defense terms of the Tripartite Pact until the US counterattacked Japan. However, relations between the European Axis Powers and the United States had deteriorated since 1937. The United States had been in an undeclared state of war with Germany in the Battle of the Atlantic since Roosevelt publicly confirmed a "shoot on sight" policy on 11 September 1941. Hitler could no longer ignore the military aid the US was giving Britain and the Soviet Union in the Lend-Lease programme. On December 5, 1941, the Germans learned of the United States Armed Forces' contingency planning to invade Nazi-occupied Continental Europe by 1943; this was Rainbow Five, published by the Chicago Tribune on the previous day. Moreover, with Roosevelt's initiation of a Neutrality Patrol, which in fact also escorted British ships, as well as orders to U.S. Navy destroyers first to actively report U-boats, then "shoot on sight", American neutrality was honored more in the breach than observance. Admiral Ernest King privately stated he believed the US was already at war with Germany in December 1940. Admiral Erich Raeder had urged Hitler to declare war throughout 1941, so the Kriegsmarine could begin the Second Happy Time in the Battle of the Atlantic.

Hitler had agreed that Germany would almost certainly declare war when the Japanese first informed him of their intention to go to war with the United States on 17 November 1941. He had already decided war with the United States was unavoidable, and the Pearl Harbor attack, the publication of Rainbow Five, and Roosevelt's post-Pearl Harbor address, which focused on European affairs as well as the situation with Japan, probably contributed to the declaration. Hitler expected the United States would soon declare war on Germany in any event in view of the Second Happy Time. He disastrously underestimated American military production capacity, the United States' own ability to fight on two fronts, and the time his own Operation Barbarossa would require. Similarly, the Nazis may have hoped the declaration of war, a showing of solidarity with Japan, would result in closer collaboration with the Japanese in Eurasia, particularly against the Soviet Union and planned for in secret by Japan — something that would not materialize, due to existing relations between Moscow and Tokyo at that time. Soviet code-breakers had broken the Japanese diplomatic codes, and Moscow knew from signals intelligence that there would be no Japanese attack on the Soviet Union in 1941.

The decision to declare war on the United States allowed the United States to enter the European war in support of the United Kingdom and the Soviet Union without much public opposition.

Even as early as mid-March 1941, President Roosevelt was quite acutely aware of Hitler's hostility towards the United States, and the destructive potential it presented, in reference to Hitler's statement of a "new order in Europe" during the Führer's own Berlin Sportpalast speech of January 30, 1941, the eighth anniversary of the Nazis' Machtergreifung. In a speech to the White House Correspondents' Association on U.S. involvement in the war in Europe, Roosevelt stated:

...Nazi forces are not seeking mere modifications in colonial maps or in minor European boundaries. They openly seek the destruction of all elective systems of government on every continent, including our own. They seek to establish systems of government based on the regimentation of all human beings by a handful of individual rulers who seize power by force.
Yes, these men and their hypnotized followers call this a "New Order." It is not new, and it is not order. For order among nations presupposes something enduring, some system of justice under which individuals over a long period of time are willing to live. Humanity will never permanently accept a system imposed by conquest, and based on slavery. These modern tyrants find it necessary to their plans to eliminate all democracies — eliminate them one by one. The nations of Europe, and indeed we, ourselves, did not appreciate that purpose. We do now.

Author Ian Kershaw records Hitler's initial reaction to the attack, when he was first informed about it on the evening of 7 December at Führer Headquarters: "We can't lose the war at all. We now have an ally which has never been conquered in 3,000 years". Well before the attack, in 1928 Hitler had confided in the text of his then-unpublished Zweites Buch that while the Soviet Union was the most important immediate foe that the Third Reich had to defeat, the United States was the most important long-term challenge to Nazi aims.

Hitler awarded Imperial Japanese ambassador to Nazi Germany Hiroshi Ōshima the Grand Cross of the Order of the German Eagle in Gold (1st class) after the attack, praising Japan for striking hard and without first declaring war.

== British reaction ==
The United Kingdom declared war on Japan nine hours before the U.S. did, partially due to Japanese attacks on the British colonies of Malaya, Singapore, and Hong Kong; and partially due to Winston Churchill's promise to declare war "within the hour" of a Japanese attack on the United States.

The war had been going poorly for the British Empire for more than two years. The United Kingdom was by now the sole country in Western Europe unoccupied by the Nazis, other than the neutral powers. Prime Minister Winston Churchill was deeply concerned about the future; he had long attempted to persuade America to enter the war against the Nazis but had been continually rebuffed by American isolationists who argued that the war was purely a European issue and should not be America's concern, and who had prevented Roosevelt from involving the U.S. any further than selling food, weapons and other military materiel, and supplies to the British. On December 7, Churchill was at the Prime Minister's official country residence, Chequers, with a few friends and his family. Just after dinner he was given news of the attack on Pearl Harbor. Churchill correctly surmised the consequences of the attack for the course of the entire war.

So, we had won after all! ...We had won the war. England would live; Britain would live; the Commonwealth of Nations and the Empire would live. How long the war would last or in what fashion it would end no man could tell, nor did I at this moment care. . . . but now we should not be wiped out. Our history would not come to an end. We might not even have to die as individuals. Hitler's fate was sealed. Mussolini's fate was sealed. As for the Japanese, they would be ground to powder. All the rest was merely the proper application of overwhelming force.

== Canadian response ==
Following the Japanese attack on the Americans, William Lyon Mackenzie King, the Prime Minister of the Dominion of Canada advised George VI, King of Canada, that a state of war should exist between Canada and Japan, and the King accordingly issued this proclamation on December 8:

Whereas by and with the advice of our Privy Council for Canada we have signified our approval of the issue of a proclamation in the Canada Gazette declaring that a state of war with Japan exists and has existed in Canada as and from the 7th day of December 1941.

Now, therefore, we do hereby declare and proclaim that a state of war with Japan exists and has existed as and from the seventh day of December 1941.

Of all which our loving subjects and all others whom these presents may concern are hereby required to take notice and to govern themselves accordingly.

As part of the British Empire forces, Canada remained focused on the European theatre, like the United States, and following VE Day was still in the process of transitioning its military force for a campaign in East Asia and the western Pacific when VJ Day arrived.

== Investigations and blame ==
President Roosevelt appointed the Roberts Commission, headed by U.S. Supreme Court Justice Owen Roberts, to investigate and report facts and findings with respect to the attack on Pearl Harbor. It was the first of many official investigations (nine in all). Both the Fleet commander, Rear Admiral Husband E. Kimmel, and the Army commander, Lieutenant General Walter Short (the Army had been responsible for air defense of Hawaii, including Pearl Harbor, and for general defense of the islands against hostile attack), were relieved of their commands shortly thereafter. They were accused of "dereliction of duty" by the Roberts Commission for not making reasonable defensive preparations.

None of the investigations conducted during the war nor the Congressional investigation afterward provided enough reason to reverse those actions. The decisions of the Navy and War Departments to relieve both was controversial at the time and have remained so ever since. However, neither was court-martialed, as would normally have been the result of dereliction of duty. On May 25, 1999, the United States Senate voted to recommend both officers be exonerated on all charges, citing "denial to Hawaii commanders of vital intelligence available in Washington," but neither President Clinton nor his successors have done so.

A Joint Congressional Committee was also appointed, on September 14, 1945, to investigate the causes of the attack and subsequent disaster. It was convened on November 15, 1945.

== Rise of anti-Japanese sentiment and historical significance ==
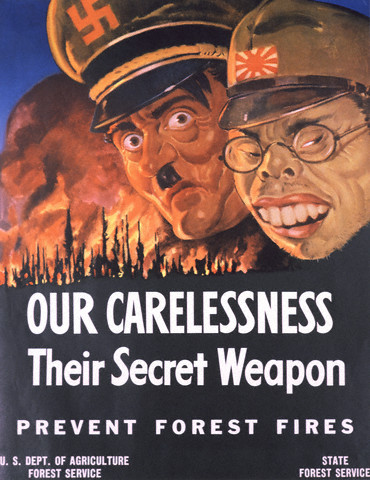
United States World War II propaganda poster depicting Adolf Hitler and Hideki Tōjō (without his mustache)

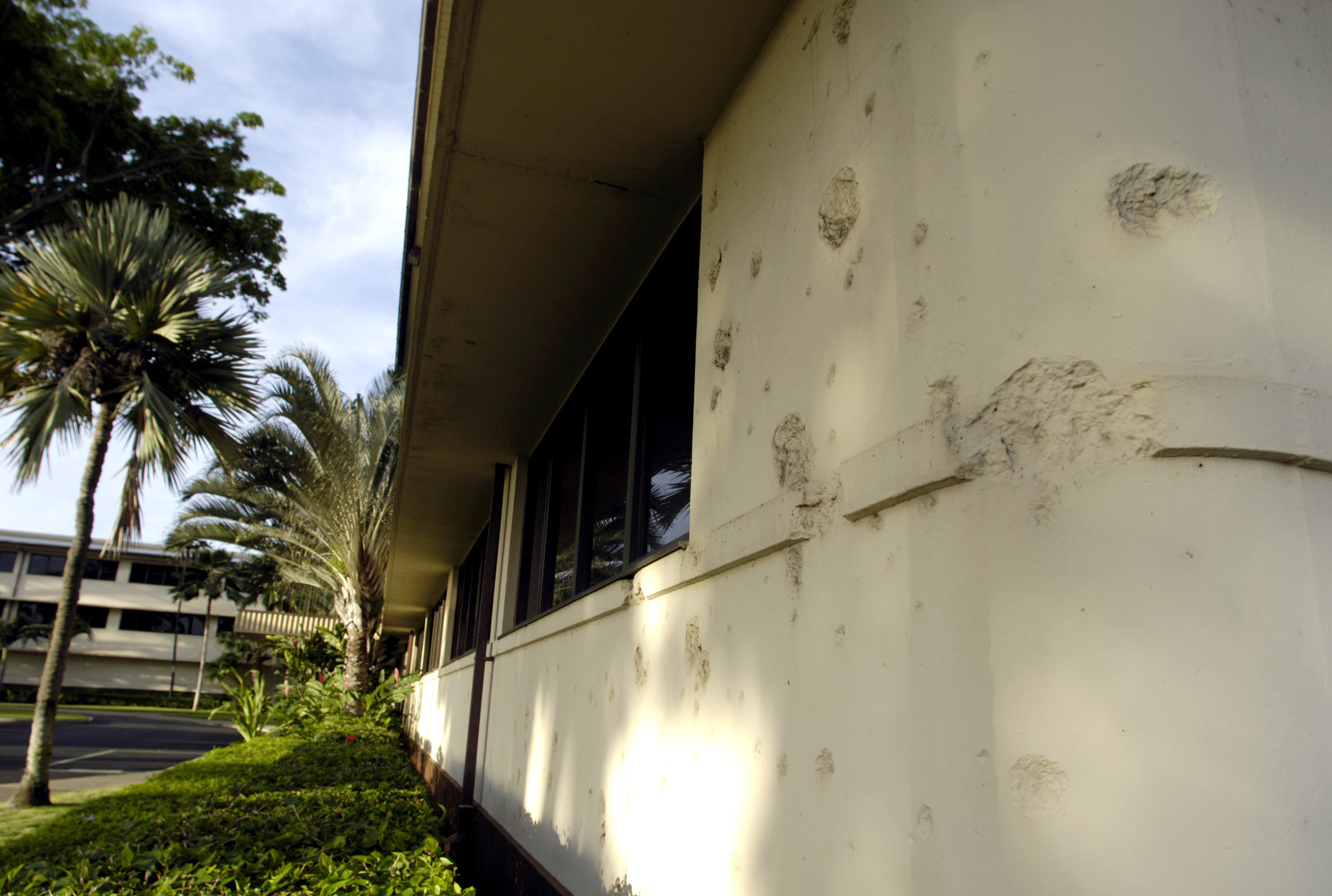
Damage to the headquarters building at Hickam Field, which is still visible

The Japanese attack on Pearl Harbor coupled with their alliance with the Nazis and the ensuing war in the Pacific fueled anti-Japanese sentiment, racism, xenophobia, and anti-Axis sentiment in the Allied nations like never before. Japanese, Japanese-Americans and Asians having a similar physical appearance were regarded with deep-seated suspicion, distrust and hostility. The attack was viewed as having been conducted in an extremely underhanded way and also as a very "treacherous" or "sneaky attack". Suspicions were further fueled by the Niihau incident, as historian Gordon Prange stated "the rapidity with which the three resident Japanese went over to the pilot's cause", which troubled the Hawaiians. "The more pessimistic among them cited the Niihau Incident as proof that no one could trust any Japanese, even if an American citizen, not to go over to Japan if it appeared expedient."

The attack, the subsequent declarations of war, and fear of "Fifth Columnists" resulted in internment of Japanese, German, and Italian populations in the United States and others, for instance the Japanese American internment, German American internment, Italian American internment, Japanese Canadian internment, German Canadian internment, and Italian Canadian internment. The attack resulted in the United States fighting the Germans and Italians, among others, in Europe and Japan in the Pacific.

The consequences were world-changing. Prime Minister Winston Churchill knew that the survival of the British Empire depended on American aid, and since 1940 had frequently asked Roosevelt to declare war. Churchill aide John Colville stated that the prime minister and American Ambassador John Gilbert Winant, who also supported the British, "sort of danced around the room together" as the United States would now enter the war, making a British victory likely. Churchill later wrote, "Being saturated and satiated with emotion and sensation, I went to bed and slept the sleep of the saved and thankful."

By opening the Pacific War, which ended in the unconditional surrender of Japan, the attack on Pearl Harbor led to the breaking of an Asian check on Soviet expansion. The Allied victory in this war and the subsequent U.S. emergence as a dominant world power, eclipsing Britain, have shaped international politics ever since.

Pearl Harbor is generally regarded as an extraordinary event in American history, remembered as the first time since the War of 1812 that America was attacked in strength on its territory by foreign people – with only the September 11 attacks almost 60 years later being of a similarly catastrophic scale.

== Perception of the attack today ==
Some Japanese nationalists today feel they were compelled to fight because of threats to their national interests and an embargo imposed by the United States, the United Kingdom and the Netherlands. The most important embargo was on oil on which its Navy and much of the economy was dependent. For example, Japan Times, an English-language newspaper owned by one of the major news organizations in Japan (Asahi Shimbun), ran numerous columns in the early 2000s echoing Kurusu's comments in reference to the Pearl Harbor attack.

In putting the Pearl Harbor attack into context, Japanese writers repeatedly contrast the thousands of U.S. citizens killed there with the hundreds of thousands of Japanese civilians killed in U.S. air attacks on Japan during the war, even without mentioning the 1945 atomic bombings of Hiroshima and Nagasaki by the United States.

However, in spite of the perceived inevitability of the war by many Japanese, many also believe the Pearl Harbor attack, although a tactical victory, was actually part of a seriously flawed strategy against the U.S. As one columnist wrote, "The Pearl Harbor attack was a brilliant tactic, but part of a strategy based on the belief that a spirit as firm as iron and as beautiful as cherry blossoms could overcome the materially wealthy United States. That strategy was flawed, and Japan's total defeat would follow." In 1941, the Japanese Foreign Ministry released a statement saying Japan had intended to make a formal declaration of war to the United States at 1 p.m. Washington time, 25 minutes before the attack at Pearl Harbor was scheduled to begin. This officially acknowledged something that had been publicly known for years. Diplomatic communications had been coordinated well in advance with the attack, but had failed delivery at the intended time. It appears the Japanese government was referring to the "14-part message", which did not actually break off negotiations, let alone declare war, but did officially raise the possibility of a break in relations. However, because of various delays, the Japanese ambassador was unable to deliver this message until well after the attack had begun.

Imperial Japanese military leaders appear to have had mixed feelings about the attack. Fleet Admiral Isoroku Yamamoto was unhappy about the botched timing of the breaking off of negotiations. He is on record as having said, in the previous year, "I can run wild for six months ... after that, I have no expectation of success." The reports of American reactions, terming it a "sneak attack" and "infamous behavior", confirmed that the effect on American morale had been the opposite of what was intended.

The Prime Minister of Japan during World War II, Hideki Tōjō, later wrote, "When reflecting upon it today, that the Pearl Harbor attack should have succeeded in achieving surprise seems a blessing from Heaven."

In January 1941 Yamamoto had said, regarding the imminent war with the United States, "Should hostilities once break out between Japan and the United States, it is not enough that we take Guam and the Philippines, nor even Hawaii and San Francisco. We would have to march into Washington and sign the treaty in the White House. I wonder if our politicians (who speak so lightly of a Japanese-American war) have confidence as to the outcome and are prepared to make the necessary sacrifices?"

=== Revisionism controversies ===
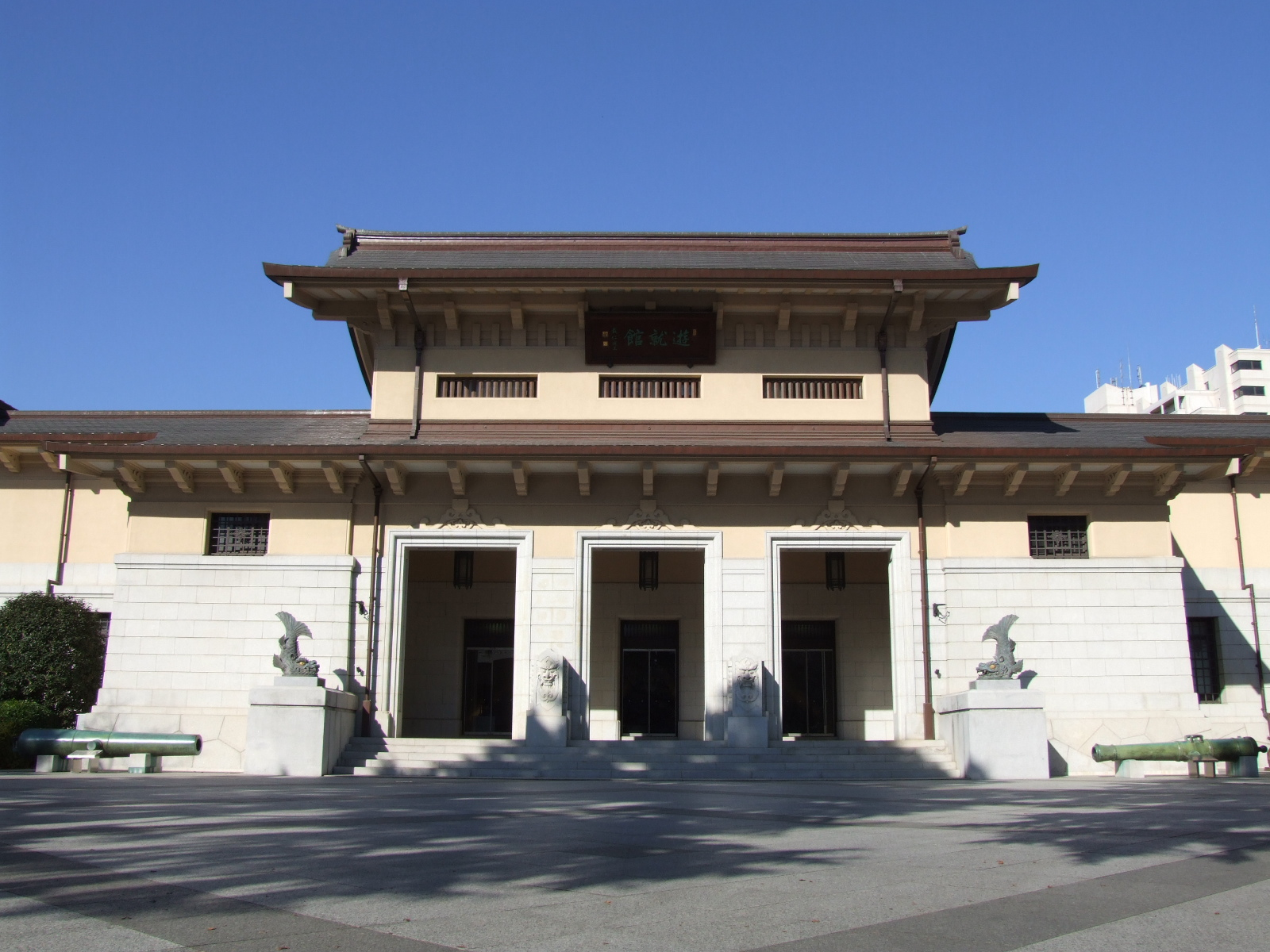
Some exhibits of Yasukuni Yusyukan have been criticised because of justification of the attack on Pearl Harbor.

There are some revisionists in Japan who claim that the attack on Pearl Harbor was a legitimate attack. These historical perspectives are often claimed by Japanese Shintoists and nationalists and have been criticized from both inside and outside Japan.

- An exhibit at the Yasukuni Shrine Museum (Yūshūkan) asserts that the attack on Pearl Harbor was a trick by U.S. President Franklin D. Roosevelt and denies that Japan committed any atrocities.
- In 2006, Henry Hyde, chairman of the United States House Committee on Foreign Affairs, sent a letter to House Speaker Dennis Hastert on April 26 to show concern about Junichiro Koizumi's visits to the Yasukuni Shrine. He pointed out that this shrine honors Hideki Tōjō and other convicted Class-A war criminals who were involved in the Pearl Harbor attack.
- In May 2007, the Japan Ministry of Education distributed an animated DVD Hokori (Pride) which was created by Junior Chamber International Japan (JC). Japanese Communist Party Diet member Yuko Ishii introduced and criticized it to the House of Representatives of Japan on May 17, and revealed that its contents glamorized Class-A war criminals and had the main character Yuta tell his girlfriend Kokoro that the battle was a "self-defense attack" and "Asian colonial liberation" against American imperialism.
- On October 31, 2008, Toshio Tamogami, former chief of staff of Japan's Air Self-Defense Force, published an essay which argued that Franklin D. Roosevelt, who had allegedly been manipulated by the Comintern, drew Japan into the attack on Pearl Harbor. Following the essay's publication, Defense Minister Yasukazu Hamada removed Tamogami from his post and ordered him to retire, since the essay's viewpoint contradicted the government position. Tamogami, on November 3, 2008, confirmed that the essay accurately expressed his views on the war and Japan's role in it.

While not specifically directed at revisionism, but more as a likely result of Prime Minister Shinzo Abe's controversial visits to the Yasukuni Shrine, where some 1,600 war criminals were enshrined after their executions, by February 2015 some concern within the Imperial House of Japan — which normally does not issue such statements — over the issue was voiced by then-Crown Prince Naruhito. Naruhito stated on his 55th birthday (February 23, 2015) that it was "important to look back on the past humbly and correctly", in reference to Japan's role in World War II-era war crimes, and that he was concerned about the ongoing need to "correctly pass down tragic experiences and the history behind Japan to the generations who have no direct knowledge of the war, at the time memories of the war are about to fade".

== Analysis ==
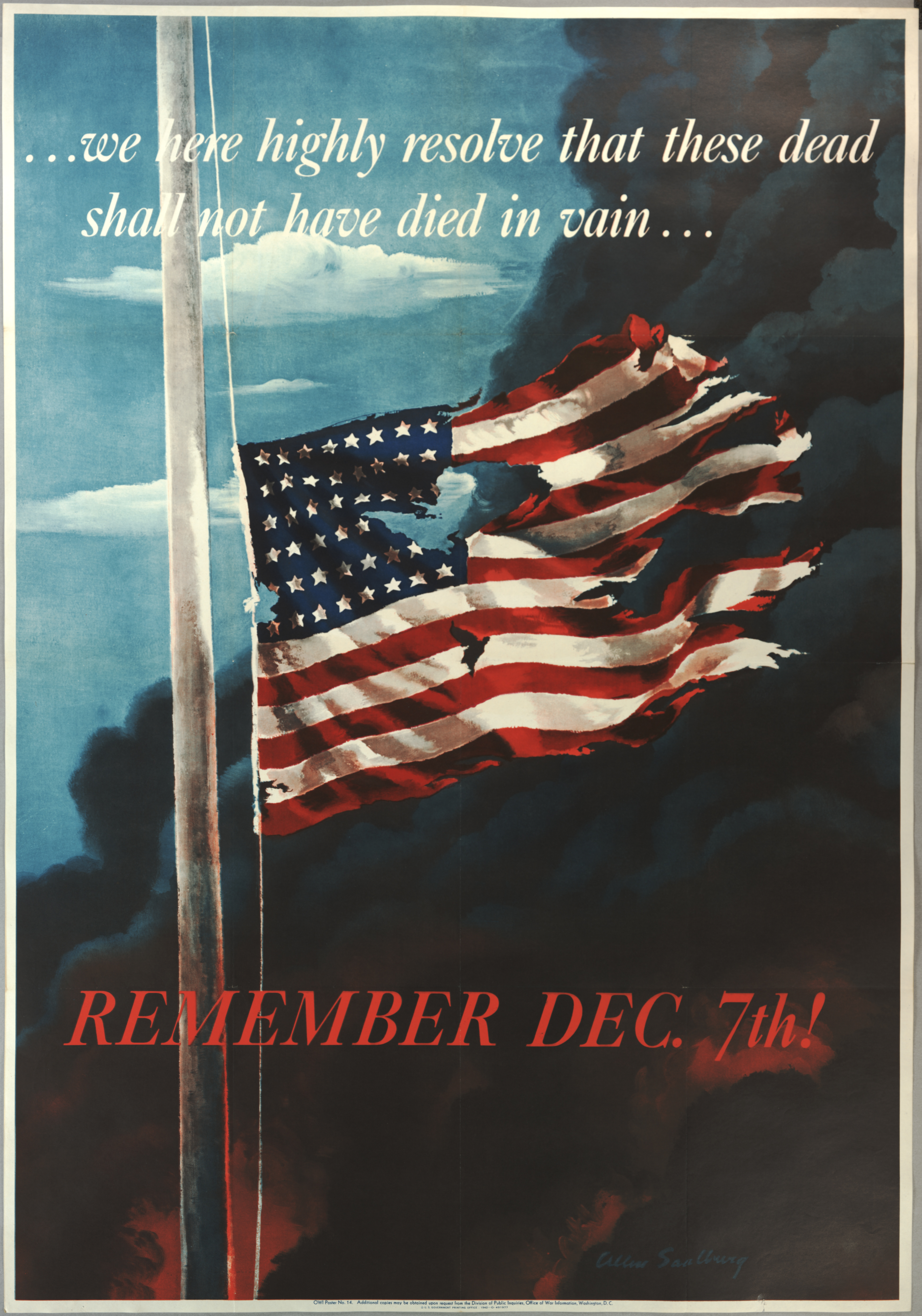
Posters like Allen Saalberg's strengthened American resolve against the Axis powers.

=== Tactical implications ===
The attack was notable for its considerable destruction, as putting most of the U.S. battleships out of commission was regarded—in both navies and by most military observers worldwide—as a tremendous success for Japan. Influenced by the earlier Battle of Taranto, which pioneered the all-aircraft naval attack but resulted in far less damage and casualties, the Japanese struck against Pearl Harbor on a much larger scale than did the British at Taranto.

The attack was a great shock to all the Allies in the Pacific Theater, and it was initially believed Pearl Harbor changed the balance of power, similar to how Taranto did the Mediterranean, both in the attackers' favor. Three days later, with the sinking of Prince of Wales and Repulse off the coast of Malaya, British Prime Minister Winston Churchill exclaimed, "In all the war I never received a more direct shock. As I turned and twisted in bed the full horror of the news sank in upon me. There were no British or American capital ships in the Indian Ocean or the Pacific except the American survivors of Pearl Harbor who were hastening back to California. Over this vast expanse of waters Japan was supreme and we everywhere were weak and naked."

However, Pearl Harbor did not have as crippling an effect on American operations as initially thought. Unlike the close confines of the Mediterranean, the vast expanses of the Pacific limited the tactical value of battleships as a fleet in being. Furthermore, unlike new fast battleships such as the Iowa class, the slow battleships were incapable of operating with carrier task forces, so once repaired they were relegated to delivering pre-invasion bombardments during the island hopping offensive against Japanese-held islands. These Pearl Harbor veterans were later part of a force that defeated IJN battleships at the Battle of Surigao Strait, an engagement very lopsided in the USN's favor in any case. A major flaw of Japanese strategic thinking was a belief that the ultimate Pacific battle would be between battleships of both sides, in keeping with the doctrine of Captain Alfred Mahan. Seeing the decimation of battleships at the hands of aircraft, Yamamoto (and his successors) hoarded his battleships for a "decisive battle" that never happened, only committing a handful to the forefront of the Battles of Midway and Guadalcanal.

One of the main Japanese objectives was to destroy the three American aircraft carriers stationed in the Pacific, but they were not present: Enterprise was returning from Wake, Lexington from Midway, and Saratoga was under refit at Puget Sound Naval Shipyard. Had Japan sunk the American carriers, the U.S. would have sustained significant damage to the Pacific Fleet's ability to conduct offensive operations for a year or so (given no further diversions from the Atlantic Fleet). As it was, the elimination of the battleships left the U.S. Navy with no choice but to place its faith in aircraft carriers and submarines—particularly the large numbers under construction of the U.S. Navy's Essex-class aircraft carriers, 11 of which had been ordered before the attack—the very weapons with which the U.S. Navy halted and eventually reversed the Japanese advance.

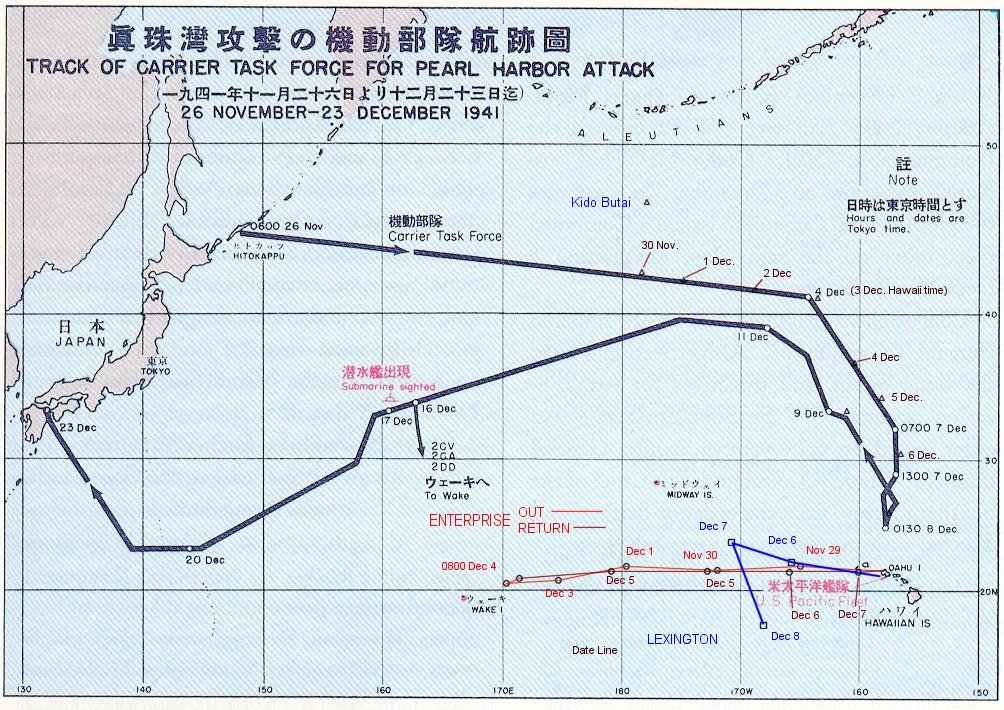
Carrier Striking Task Force two-way route. Legend: Kido Butai USS Enterprise (CV-6) USS Lexington (CV-2)

==== Battleships ====
Despite the perception of this battle as a devastating blow to America, only three ships were permanently lost to the U.S. Navy. These were the battleships Arizona, Oklahoma, and the old battleship Utah (then used as a target ship); nevertheless, much usable material was salvaged from them, including the two aft main turrets from Arizona. The majority of each battleship's crews survived; there were exceptions as heavy casualties resulted from Arizona's magazine exploding and the Oklahoma capsizing. Four ships sunk during the attack were later raised and returned to duty, including the battleships California, West Virginia and Nevada. California and West Virginia had an effective torpedo-defense system which held up remarkably well, despite the weight of fire they had to endure, resulting in most of their crews being saved. Maryland and Tennessee suffered relatively light damage, as did Pennsylvania, which was in drydock at the time.

Chester Nimitz said later, "It was God's mercy that our fleet was in Pearl Harbor on December 7, 1941." Nimitz believed if Kimmel had discovered the Japanese approach to Pearl Harbor, he would have sortied to meet them. With the American carriers absent and Kimmel's battleships at a severe disadvantage to the Japanese carriers, the likely result would have been the sinking of the American battleships at sea in deep water, where they would have been lost forever with tremendous casualties (up to twenty thousand dead), instead of in Pearl Harbor, where the crews could easily be rescued, and six battleships ultimately restored to duty. This was also the reaction of Joseph Rochefort, head of HYPO, when he remarked the attack was cheap at the price.

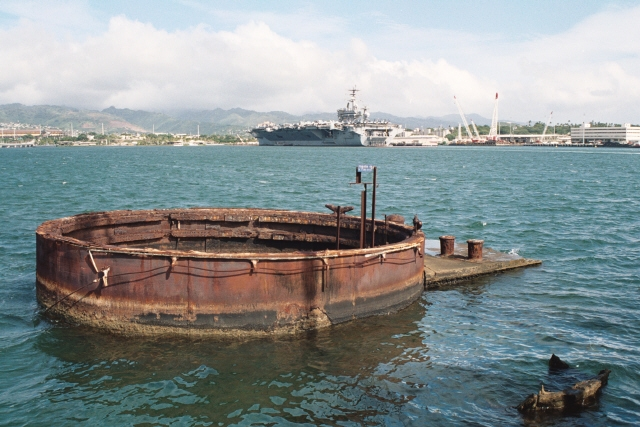
Arizona barbette, 2005

Many of the surviving battleships were extensively refitted, including the replacement of their outdated secondary battery of anti-surface 5"/51 caliber guns with more useful turreted dual-purpose 5"/38 caliber guns, allowing them to better cope with the new tactical reality. Addition of modern radar to the salvaged vessels would give them a marked qualitative advantage over those of the IJN.

The repaired U.S. battleships primarily provided fire support for amphibious landings. Their low speed was a liability to their deployment in the vast expanses of the Pacific; for instance, they could not accompany the fleet carriers that had become the dominant combatants. Six of the Standard Type vessels participated in the last battleship versus battleship engagement in naval history, the Battle of Surigao Strait, where none of them were hit. During active duty, being well protected by escorts and air cover, none of the Pearl Harbor battleships suffered serious damage save for Pennsylvania which was permanently crippled by a torpedo in the closing stages of the war; on September 2, 1945, West Virginia was among the Allied fleet in Tokyo Bay when the Japanese officially surrendered.

==== Carriers ====
The attack on Pearl Harbor failed to sight, or destroy, any of the Pacific Fleet's three aircraft carriers; they had been designated as primary targets along with the battleships. The carriers Lexington and Enterprise were ferrying additional fighters to American bases on the islands of Wake and Midway while Saratoga was under refit at Puget Sound Naval Shipyard. At the time of the Japanese attack, the US was expecting imminent war with Japan, beginning in any of several places, such as the Philippines or Allied bases in Borneo. Nagumo's hesitation, and failure to find and destroy the American carriers, may have been a product of his lack of faith in the attack plan, and of the fact he was a gunnery officer, not an aviator. In addition, Yamamoto's targeting priorities, placing battleships first in importance, reflected an out-of-date Mahanian doctrine, and an inability to extrapolate from history, given the damage German submarines did to British trade in World War I. In the end, Japan achieved surprisingly little for all her daring and apparent success - with the first of the fourteen wartime-commissioned U.S. Navy Essex-class aircraft carriers, Essex, being commissioned just over a year (New Year's Eve Day 1942) after the Pearl Harbor attack.

==== Shore installations ====
Tank farms, containing 140 million U.S. gallons (530 million liters) of bunker oil, were unscathed, providing a ready source of fuel for American fleets at the submarine base. About this missed opportunity, Admiral Chester Nimitz would later say, "Had the Japanese destroyed the oil, it would have prolonged the war another two years." These were vital to the initial phase of the war, and to commerce raiding throughout, and illustrate the deficiencies of Japanese planning for the attack. The Navy Yard, critical to ship maintenance, and repair of ships damaged in the attack was untouched. The engineering and initial repair shops, as well as the torpedo store, were intact. Other items of base infrastructure and operation, such as power generation, continued to operate normally. Also critical to the way the Pacific War was actually fought was the cryptanalysis unit, Station HYPO, located in the basement of the old Administration Building. It was undamaged and even benefited by gaining staff from unemployed ship's bands.

The United States Army Air Force's loss of aircraft must be balanced against the fact that many of them were obsolete, such as the Curtiss P-40 Warhawk's predecessor, the Curtiss P-36 Hawk. Japan might have achieved a good deal more with not much additional effort or loss.

==== Charts ====
Capital ships prior to attack
Location	Battleships	Aircraft carriers
United States
Atlantic	6 (+2*)	4 (+1*)
Pacific	9	3
(Empire of Japan) Japan (Empire of Japan)
Pacific	10 (+1*)	10
*Plus ships completed but not yet commissioned. US: North Carolina, Washington and Hornet; Japan: Yamato

Capital ships after attack
Location	Battleships	Aircraft carriers
United States
Atlantic	6 (+2*)	4 (+1*)
Pacific	1 (+6**)	3
(Empire of Japan) Japan (Empire of Japan)
Pacific	10 (+1*)	9
**Ships which can be repaired: California, West Virginia, Nevada, Maryland, Tennessee, Pennsylvania.

Capital ships 12/1942
Location	Battleships	Aircraft carriers
United States
Atlantic	4	1
Pacific	12 (+3**)	3
(Empire of Japan) Japan (Empire of Japan)
Pacific	10	6
**Ships which can be repaired: California,West Virginia, Nevada; US ships lost: Lexington, Yorktown, Wasp, Hornet; US ships gained: Essex, North Carolina, Washington, South Dakota, Indiana, Massachusetts, Alabama Japanese ships lost: Shoho, Akagi, Kaga, Soryu, Hiryu, Hiei, Kirishima; Japanese ships gained: Yamato, Musashi, Junyo, Hiyo.

Of the 22 Japanese ships that took part in the attack, only one survived the war, the Ushio. As of 2006, the only U.S. ships in that were present at Pearl Harbor during the attack still remaining afloat are the Coast Guard Cutter WHEC-37 and the yard tug Hoga. Both remained active over 50 years after the attack and have been designated as museum ships.

=== Strategic implications ===
Some historians argue the Japanese fell victim to victory disease (overconfidence after early successes). It has also been stated by the Japanese military commanders and politicians who visited and lived in the United States, that their leadership (mostly military personnel) took the war with the United States relatively lightly, compared to them. For instance, Admiral Yamamoto and General Tadamichi Kuribayashi expressed concerns about the greater industrial power of the United States.

The "Europe First" strategy, loss of air cover over Pearl Harbor, and subsequent loss of the Philippines, meant the U.S. Army and Army Air Forces were unable to play a significant role in the Pacific War for several months. Japan was temporarily free of worries about its major rival Pacific naval power, which was at least part of the intention of the attack. Because Australian, New Zealand, Dutch and most British forces were in Europe, Japan conquered nearly all of Southeast Asia and the Southwest Pacific, and extended her reach far into the Indian Ocean without significant interference and with nearly universal tactical success.

In the long term, the attack on Pearl Harbor was a grand strategic blunder for Japan. Indeed, Admiral Yamamoto, who conceived it, predicted even success here could not win a war with the United States, because the American industrial capacity was too large. It spurred the United States into a determination to seek complete victory. The war resulted in the destruction of the Japanese armed forces, the occupation of the home islands (a state never before achieved in Japan's history), and the occupation of Okinawa and the Ryukyu Islands by the United States until 1972, while the Soviet Russian re-annexation of the Kuril Islands and Sakhalin's southern part, and the restoration of Formosa (Taiwan) to China, and the loss of Korea have not been reversed to this day.

==== Contrast to other similar operations ====
The earlier British raid on Taranto, which is often regarded as the inspiration for the Pearl Harbor attack, achieved its strategic goal being a considerably smaller operation that inflicted much less devastation. Not only did it cost the Italian fleet half of its capital ships in one night, the Regia Marina immediately transferred its undamaged ships from Taranto to Naples to protect them from similar attacks, until the defences at Taranto (mainly the anti-torpedo nets) were brought up to adequate levels to protect them from further attacks of the same kind (which happened between March and May 1941). After Taranto the balance of power swung to the British Mediterranean Fleet, which now enjoyed more operational freedom: when previously forced to operate as one unit to match Italian capital ships, they could now split into two battlegroups; each built around one aircraft carrier and two battleships. Battleships were found to be more useful in the confines of the Mediterranean as opposed to the expanses of the Pacific; furthermore the older American battleships were too slow to escort the carriers and were chiefly used as fire support for amphibious operations. Because the US Pacific fleet had five out of eight battleships sunk (three of them permanent losses) at Pearl Harbor, this meant it had to rely upon the untouched aircraft carriers for offensive operations against the Japanese.

Truk Lagoon, often considered by some as the Japanese equivalent of Pearl Harbor, was attacked by US carrier aircraft in Operation Hailstone in 1944. The Combined Fleet had evacuated their major units, so the only warships lost were two light cruisers and four destroyers. Nonetheless the Japanese shipping losses totalled almost 200,000 tons, including auxiliaries and cargo ships which hampered logistics; particularly serious was the loss of valuable fleet oilers. The US strikes damaged Truk's dockyards, communications centers, the submarine base, and supply dumps including destroying 17,000 tons of stored fuel, while Pearl Harbor's equivalents were largely untouched in the 1941 attack. Afterward Operation Hailstone, the US went on to isolate the whole area of operations with submarine and air attacks, severing Japanese shipping lanes between empire waters and critical fuel supplies to the south.

== See also ==
- Nazi War Crimes and Japanese Imperial Government Records Interagency Working Group
- Japanese war crimes
- Unrestricted submarine warfare
- Attacks on the United States
