= Lee Ji-eun =

Lee Ji-eun may refer to:

- Lee Ji-eun (footballer) (born 1979), South Korean footballer
- Lee Ji-eun (swimmer) (born 1989), South Korean swimmer
- Lee Ji-eun (actress, born 1971), (1971–2021), South Korean actress
- Lee Ji-eun (athlete), South Korean runner in the 2005 Asian Athletics Championships
- Lee Ji-eun, birth name of IU (born 1993), South Korean singer, songwriter, and actress
- Lee Ji-eun, contestant on Dancing 9, a South Korean dance survival program
- Lee Ji Eun, member of JQT, a South Korean girl group
- Lee Ji-eun, South Korean contestant for Miss World 1968
