= Birdcage Inn =

1998 South Korean film by Kim Ki-duk

- Poster for Birdcage Inn
- Hangul: 파란 대문
- Lit.: Blue Gate
- RR: Paran daemun
- MR: P'aran taemun
- Directed by: Kim Ki-duk
- Written by: Kim Ki-duk; Seo Jeong-min
- Produced by: Lee Seung-jae
- Starring: Lee Ji-eun; Lee Hae-eun; Ahn Jae-mo
- Cinematography: Seo Jeong-min
- Edited by: Ko Im-pyo
- Music by: Lee Moon-hui
- Distributed by: Boogui Cinema
- Release date: 31 October 1998
- Running time: 100 minutes
- Country: South Korea
- Language: Korean

Birdcage Inn (Korean: 파란 대문; RR: Paran daemun; lit. 'Blue Gate') is South Korean director Kim Ki-duk's third film, released in 1998. The drama stars Lee Ji-eun, Lee Hae-eun and Ahn Jae-mo. It was released domestically in October 1998, and screened at the Berlin International Film Festival in February 1999.

== Plot ==
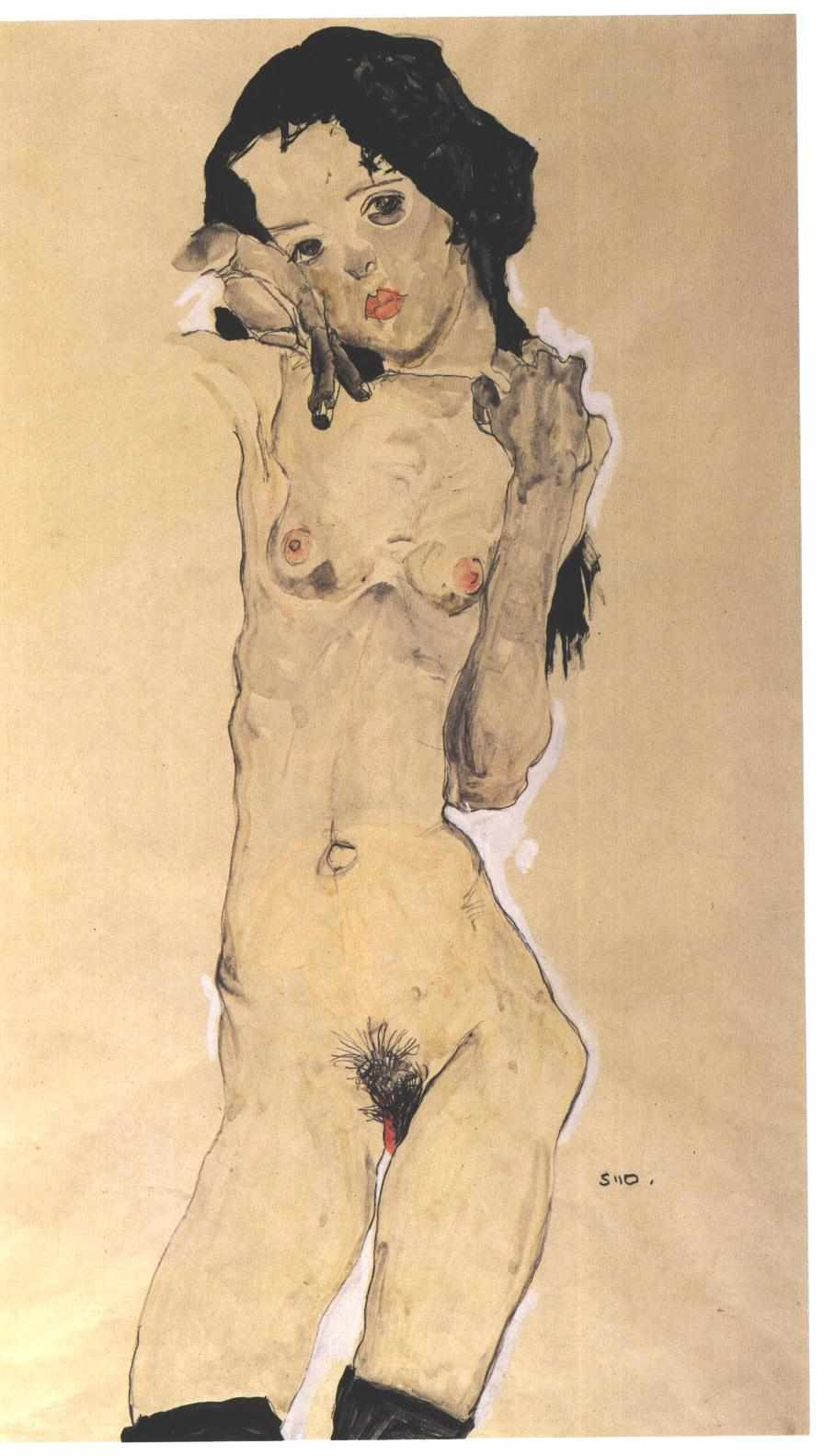
Jin-a brings copy of the painting Girl with Black Hair by Egon Schile on the beach in the first scene. Later it can be seen in her room.

Jin-a (Lee Ji-eun), a 22-year-old prostitute, arrives at a small seaside motel called the Birdcage Inn to replace the previous one. The inn is run by a couple who have a daughter and a son. They provide Jin-a with room and board and make a living by renting out rooms and taking a cut of the money she earns. Jin-a works at night and spends her daytime drawing and watching the sea.

In addition to her circumstances Jin-a has a hard time because of the family. The well regarded, silent, apparently caring, father providing for his family rapes Jin-a. The mother only sees Jin-a as a source of money to make a living and to fund the education of her college student daughter and high school student son. The son, Hyun-woo (Ahn Jae-mo), begs to be allowed to take naked pictures of Jin-a for a photo contest and to have sex with her. At first, Jin-a turns him down. However, after Hyun-woo's long imploration, Jin-a poses for him on the deck of a ship by the seaside and has sex with him. Afterwards he uses his Walkman to tap Jin-a's room to listen in on Jin-a and her guests.

The daughter, Hye-mi (Lee Hye-eun), who is sexually repressed, is the same age as Jin-a, does nothing to hide her contempt towards Jin-a. She expresses her hostility by refusing to use the same toothpaste and hand basin as Jin-a and ignores Jin-a's gestures of friendship, such as sharing an umbrella and buying her a Walkman which she has been dying to have. She emphasizes to Jin-a that she and Jin-a belong to different worlds. The relationship between the two becomes even worse when Hye-mi finds out that her sexually frustrated boyfriend, with whom Hye-mi has refused to have sex with before marriage, has gone to Jin-a and has had sex with her.

One day, rummaging through Jin-a's room and personal possessions Hye-mi gains an insight into Jin-a that allows her to develop an empathy towards Jin-a. That night Hye-mi lies in bed and eavesdrops on Jin-a and a customer.

Meanwhile, a publisher who has seen Hyun-woo's photos of Jin-a goes to him and deceives him into selling them at a low price. After seeing Jin-a's nude in the magazine, Jin-a's former pimp goes to her again demanding money. Supposing that she's been paid a lot for it, he beats Jin-a when she denies it; Hye-mi tries to protect Jin-a from him. That night Jin-a makes an attempt to kill herself by cutting her arm and is found by Hye-mi who has had a nightmare about Jin-a.

Jin-a and Hye-mi sit together, leaning towards each other and reconcile. That night, a customer comes to the inn and Hye-mi spends the night with him instead of the sick Jin-a and loses her virginity.

== Cast ==
- Lee Ji-eun as Jin-a
- Lee Hae-eun as Hye-mi
- Ahn Jae-mo as Hyun-woo
- Jeong Hyeong-gi as Gecko
- Son Min-seok as Jin-ho

== Reception ==
Though Birdcage Inn was not successful in the director's native country, South Korea, it was his first film which succeeded in attracting international attention. The film won the director, art award in Noosa Film Festival of Australia and was screened at the Berlin International Film Festival as an opening film in the Panorama section in February, 1999.
