= Ahn Jae-mo =

South Korean actor and singer (born 1979)

- Born: September 20, 1979 (age 47); Busan, South Korea
- Occupations: Actor; singer; ex-car racer
- Years active: 1996–present
- Spouse: Lee Da-yeon (m. 2011)

Korean name
- Hangul: 안재모
- Hanja: 安在模
- RR: An Jaemo
- MR: An Chaemo

Ahn Jae-mo (born September 20, 1979) is a South Korean actor and singer. Ahn is best known for playing gangster-turned-politician Kim Du-han in Rustic Period (2002). He has appeared in other period dramas such as Tears of the Dragon (1996), The King and the Queen (1998), The King and I (2007), The King of Legend (2010), and Jeong Do-jeon (2014). Ahn also became a car racing driver in 2004.

== Filmography ==
=== Film ===
Year	Title	Role	Notes	Ref.
1998	Birdcage Inn	Hyun-woo		
1999	Doctor K	Intern		
1999	Nowhere to Hide	Young-bae	Cameo	
2001	The Humanist	Matthew		
2001	My Wife Is a Gangster	Bada		
2002	Baby Alone	Jae-seob		
2005	Haan	Han Gil-soo		
2006	The Legend of Seven Cutter	Jung Han-soo		
2006	The City of Violence		Cameo	

=== Television series ===
Year	Title	Role	Notes	Ref.
1996	New Generation Report: Adults Don't Know			
1996	I			
1996	Tears of the Dragon	Yi Do, Grand Prince Chungnyeong		
1998	The King and the Queen	Prince Yeonsan		
1999	Assignable Appearance	Park Moon-soo		
1999	School 1	Kim Gun		
1999	Magic Castle	Kim Sun-woo		
2001	MBC Best Theater: The Road Home	Young-wook		
2001	When I Miss Someone			
2001	Mina	Kang Joon-seo		
2002	Rustic Period	Kim Du-han		
2003	Scent of a Man	Kwon Hyuk-soo		
2003	She's Cool!	Lee Dong-ki		
2004	Jang Gil-san	Militia captain	Cameo	
2006	Yeon Gaesomun	Yeon Namsaeng		
2007	Drama City: Misunderstanding or the Truth of Those Guys	Hwan-yoo		
2007	The King and I	Jung Han-soo		
2008	Korean Ghost Stories: Ghost Letter	Sa-hyun		
2008	Innocent You	Kang Ji-hwan		
2009	Korean Ghost Stories: Fox with Nine Tails	Yeon-dol		
2010	Freedom Fighter, Lee Hoe-young	Kimura Junpei		
2010	The King of Legend	Jin Seung		
2011	Pianissimo			
2011	When Women Powder Twice	Han Young-woo		
2012	HDTV Literature: The Endless World of Literature	Soo-cheol		
2012	Take Care of Us, Captain	Lee Jong-soo	Cameo	
2012	God of War	Im Yeon		
2012	It Was Love	Baek Jae-heon		
2013	Fantasy Tower	Kang Dong-wook		
2014	Jeong Do-jeon	Yi Bang-won		
2014	KBS Drama Special	Seo In-yong	episode: "Vengeful Spirit"	
2015	The Great Wives	Yoon Il-hyun		
2017	Enemies from the Past	Min Eun-seok		
2020	Memorist	Bang Joon-seok		
2021	Amor Fati	Han Jae-kyung		
2023	Tale of the Nine Tailed 1938	Kim Du-han	Cameo	

=== Television shows ===
Year	Title	Role	Notes	Ref.
2000–2001	Inkigayo	Host	April 23 – December 31, 2000; with Kim Min-hee	
2000–2001	Inkigayo	Host	January 7 – March 9, 2001; with Son Tae-young	
2021	The Night of the Night	Host		

=== Music video appearances ===
Year	Song title	Artist	Ref.
1997	"If You Love"	Lee Joo-hyeon	
1999	"Love, Never Fade Away"	Seomoon Tak	
2000	"Bless You"	Iseul	
2001	"Family Album"	J	

== Musicals ==
Year	Title	Role	Ref.
2013	Friends	Dong-su	
2014–2015	Sherlock Holmes: The Secret of the Anderson Family	Sherlock Holmes	

== Discography ==
Title	Details
My Destiny	Released: January 3, 2003; Label: Pony Canyon Korea; Track listing: 1. 한 사람을 위해; 2. 서툰 기대; 3. 너만의 이별; 4. My Destiny; 5. 남과 여 6. My Lady [내 가슴에 그녀만의 자리를 만들다]; 7. 그댈 잊는 것보다; 8. 헤어진 후에야 알게 되죠; 9. 마지막 연인; 10. 용서해줘요; 11. For You; 12. 친구의 애인; 13. 추억처럼; 14. ...; 15. ...; 16. My Destiny (2003 Mix); 17. 마지막 연인 (Club Version); 18. 용서해줘요 (Dance Mix); 19. 친구의 애인 (Remix)
Ahn Jae-mo: 1st Live Concert in Seoul	Released: June 1, 2003; Label: MK Entertainment; Track listing: 1. 서곡; 2. My Destiny; 3. For You; 4. 너만의 이별; 5. Just Once; 6. Creep; 7. 용서해줘요; 8. 친구의 애인; 9. 남자의 향기; 10. 마지막 연인; 11. 친구의 애인; 12. 헤어진 후에 알게되죠; 13. 그댈 잊는것보다; 14. 한사람을 위해; 15. 남자의 향기; 16. 서툰기대; 17. 사랑의 트위스트; 18. 사랑은 아무나하나; 19. 네박자; 20. 차차차; 21. My Lady; 22. 남과여

== Awards and nominations ==
Year	Award	Category	Nominated work	Result	Ref.
1996	KBS Drama Awards	Best Young Actor	New Generation Report: Adults Don't Know	Won	
1998	KBS Drama Awards	Best New Actor	The King and the Queen	Won	
1998	KBS Drama Awards	Popularity Award	The King and the Queen	Won	
2000	36th Baeksang Arts Awards	Best New Actor (TV)	The King and the Queen	Won	
2001	SBS Drama Awards	Excellence Award, Actor in a Drama Short	When You Miss Someone	Won	
2002	SBS Drama Awards	Grand Prize (Daesang)	Rustic Period	Won	
2002	SBS Drama Awards	Excellence Award, actor	Rustic Period	Won	
2002	SBS Drama Awards	Top 10 Stars	Rustic Period	Won	
2003	39th Baeksang Arts Awards	Most Popular Actor (TV)	Rustic Period	Won	
2004	Korea-Mongolia Cultural Exchange	Plaque of Contribution	—N/a	Won	
2007	2nd Korea Motorsports Awards	Most Valuable Player	CJ Super Race Championship	Won	
2007	SBS Drama Awards	Best Supporting Actor in a Serial Drama	The King and I	Nominated	
2009	SBS Drama Awards	Excellence Award, Actor in a Serial Drama	Innocent You	Nominated	
2014	KBS Drama Awards	Excellence Award, Actor in a One-Act/Special/Short Drama	Vengeful Spirit	Nominated	
2017	MBC Drama Awards	Top Excellence Award, Actor in a Soap Opera	Enemies from the Past	Nominated	
