= List of Japanese spies, 1930–1945 =

This is a list of Japanese spies including leaders and commanders of the Japanese Secret Intelligence Services (Kempeitai) in the period 1930 to 1945.

- Yoshio Muto – spy operating in San Francisco.
- Akashi Motojiro – Black Dragon member and agent specialized in Siberia and North Asia. Knowledgeable about China, Manchuria, Siberia. He established contacts throughout the Muslim world. These Muslim contacts would be maintained throughout World War II, both as operatives in their areas and as a hedge against Soviet aggression. Akashi eventually established networks through Europe too, that served the Black Dragons. The Black Dragons also formed close contact and even alliances with Buddhist sects throughout Asia.
- Kinoaki Matsuo – member of the ultra-nationalist Black Dragon secret society, and an officer in Japanese intelligence.
- Mitsuru Toyama – chief of Black Dragon Society, an active agent linked with Japanese Secret Service and Japanese outside agents.
- Yoshio Kodama – Japanese gangster and yakuza chief, he set up a massive network of Manchurian spies and informants spread across China.
- Hideki Tojo – the Chief of the Imperial Japanese Army, Prime Minister and chief of the Kodoha Party; for a period chief of Kwantung Army and Kempeitai Intelligence service in Manchukuo. He also maintained during his military life direct control of the Japanese Secret Services (apart from the Emperor's command of such services) and received information first through his direct link with the Black Dragon Society and his own intelligence work with the Imperial Japanese Army during the conflict.
- Kōki Hirota – former Foreign Minister and head of the Black Dragons (also guided intelligence services in the group), discussed the advantages and consequences of a conflict with the United States with War Minister Hideki Tōjō. In a conference on August 26, 1941, at a session of the Black Dragon Society HQ in Tokyo, the War Minister ordered preparation to be made to wage a total war against the armed forces of the United States. December 1941 or February 1942, were considered adequate time for this operation. Tojo said he "will start the war with America, and after sixty days he will reshuffle the cabinet and become a great dictator", at same time if analyzed the last dates provided from Japanese secret agents about Soviet Far East and European colonies in Southeast Asia, in relation to this operation.
- Michitarō Komatsubara – intelligence chief in Harbin.
- Kingoro Hashimoto – served in the secret service in Manchukuo.
- Sadao Araki – undertook some secret actions during the Siberian Japanese expeditionary force period
- Kanji Ishiwara – undertook undercover actions and espionage in Manchukuo.
- Kenji Doihara – member of a Japanese intelligence service in Manchukuo, working there and in mainland China.
- Masaiko Amakazu – secret agent in Manchukuo, chief of the Manchukuo Film Association.
- Amleto Vespa – Italian forced secret agent of Japanese and Manchu secret service.
- Kwantung Army – included the Asano Division, manned with White Russians; and "Mongol Army" special units, manned by Mongols. Imperial forces projected to use such units in secret missions and sabotage during eventual invasion of Soviet Siberia, Outer Mongolia, and Russian Far East.
- Yoshiko Kawashima – Manchu royal and Japanese secret agent in mainland China.
- Nataoke Sato – Japanese ambassador in Moscow, undertook some secret missions for the Axis powers during Eastern front battles.
- Ma Zhongying – Uyghur servant who undertook some secret actions for the Japanese.
- Trebitsch Lincoln – Hungarian.
- Kinoaki Matsuo – Foreign Affairs Ministry official who was liaison between the Japanese Foreign Office and the Imperial Admiralty.
- Mineo Ōsumi – noble and member of the Supreme War Council of Japan. He undertook some secret missions in central and southern China under the orders of the Imperial Japanese Navy.
- Shinozaki Mamoru – Japanese diplomat arrested for espionage.
- Patrick Heenan (July 1910-February 13, 1942) was a Captain in the British Indian Army, who was convicted of treason, after spying for Japanese military intelligence during the Malayan campaign of World War II. Heenan was reportedly killed in a summary execution, during the Battle of Singapore. It is alleged that the British Commonwealth military censors suppressed these events.
- William Forbes-Sempill, 19th Lord Sempill, a British peer and record-breaking air pioneer who passed secret information to the Japanese military before World War II.
- Makihara Satoru, a Mitsubishi manager in London, was arrested on 2 August 1940 on suspicion of espionage, and taken to Brixton prison. Thanks to intervention by William Forbes-Sempill (see above), he was released a few days later due to "insufficient evidence".
- Velvalee Dickinson – German American known as "The Doll Woman" who related Naval information using her New York City doll shop as a front.
- John Semer Farnsworth – former Court Martialed American Naval Officer who sold naval secrets to Japan for money in the 1930s.
