= How Japan Plans to Win =

1940 nonfiction book by Kinoaki Matsuo

- Author: Kinoaki Matsuo
- Original title: The Three-Power Alliance and the United States-Japanese War
- Translator: Kilsoo Haan
- Language: English
- Publisher: Little, Brown and Co. (Boston); George G. Harrap and Co. (London)
- Publication place: United States
- English publication date: 1942
- Media type: Print
- Pages: 323 (Little, Brown and Co.); 240 (George G. Harrap and Co.)
- OCLC: 4674240
- Text: How Japan Plans to Win at Internet Archive

How Japan Plans to Win (originally The Three-Power Alliance and the United States-Japanese War) is a 1940 nonfiction book by Kinoaki Matsuo, a Japanese Foreign Affairs Officer, Navy Admiralty Liaison, Imperial Navy strategizer, and member of the Black Dragon Society. The book predicted that the United States was planning on launching an attack on the Empire of Japan. It was originally published in Japan by the Foreign Office Press in late 1940.

The work was translated into English by Kilsoo Haan, a Korean anti-Japanese operative living in the United States. The English translation was published in 1942 simultaneously in Boston by Little, Brown and Company (323 pages) and in London by George G. Harrap and Company (240 pages). The book was reviewed in publications such as The New York Times and Foreign Affairs.

It has been described by some historians as the Japanese counterpart to the United States government contingency plan War Plan Orange.

== Synopsis ==
Kinoaki predicts an impending attack on Japan by the United States that will leave no alternative to an existential war of attrition between the two powers, pitting Japan against an arrogant, racist enemy and overwhelming odds.

== Controversy ==
A copy of the book is alleged to have been stolen from Kinoaki himself by the book’s translator, Kilsoo Haan.

Some Japanese sources allege that the book is actually a work of propaganda, intended to lift civilian morale and reassure the public of that Japan will have a chance for a negotiated peace in the event it finds itself coerced into war with the United States.

One reviewer described the book as being "on a level far beneath Mein Kampf."

== Covers ==
The version published in Boston by Little, Brown and Company featured a reproduction of the Japanese book cover and endsheets. This entailed black cloth boards with the Japanese title in red, vertically, along the right side of the cover. The endsheets were emblazoned with a red and white naval theme.

The book published in London by George G. Harrap and Company featured tan cloth boards without a title on the front or back covers.

== Reviews ==
- Chamberlain, William Henry (Apr. 26, 1942). "A Pep Talk for the Japanese." Review of How Japan Plans to Win, by Kinoaki Matsuo. The New York Times. p. BR18.
- Woolbert, Robert Gale (Jul. 1942). Review of How Japan Plans to Win, by Kinoaki Matsuo. Foreign Affairs, vol. 20, no. 4. p. 785.
- Ainger, E. (Sep. 1942). Review of How Japan Plans to Win, by Kinoaki Matsuo. International Affairs Review Supplement, vol. 19, no. 9. pp. 519–520.
