= Kilsoo Haan =

Korean-American spy (1900–1976)

Kilsoo Kenneth Haan (Korean: 한길수; Hanja: 韓吉洙 May 31, 1900 – July 1, 1976) was a Korean American intelligence operative, Korean independence activist, and both the source and translator of Kinoaki Matsuo’s contested and controversial book, The Three-Power Alliance and a United States-Japanese War (English: How Japan Plans to Win).

== Early life ==
Haan was born in Jangdan, Gyeonggi Province, Korean Empire on May 31, 1900. He was five years old when his family joined the Korean immigration to Hawaii as plantation laborers. Despite his father leaving for Korea in 1910, he and his mother remained in Hawaii, where Haan continued his education. He attended the Korean Compound School and the Ka'iulani School until the 8th grade.

In August 1920, Haan left Hawaii to spend a year preparing for the ministry at the Salvation Army Training School in San Francisco, California. Upon his return, he began his service as a Salvation Army representative on the island of Kauaʻi. Haan rose through the ranks over the following six years to make Captain.

Haan's religious career ostensibly came to an end in 1926 when he married a Korean woman from Honolulu named Stella Yoon and resigned from the Salvation Army, reportedly because his new wife's religious beliefs were in conflict with his service in the Salvation Army. After resigning, the couple returned to Honolulu.

== Political and intelligence career ==
In the 1930s, Haan became involved with the Korean independence movement by joining the Korean National Association (KNA) of Hawaii.

Haan learned of Japan's impending attack on attack on Pearl Harbor in 1941, gave multiple warnings to the US government about it, including providing information to the State Department two days before the attack that the Japanese embassy had begun selling its cars. After the attack, the State Department threatened Haan with incarceration if he revealed his warnings to the press.

Haan successfully lobbied the Justice Department to exclude Koreans from the internment of Japanese Americans, despite Korea being legally part of Japan at the time.

In the summer of 1942, Haan circulated a "secret report" to American newspapers stating that Japanese leaders Hideki Tojo and Koki Hirota had been wounded by gunshots from Korean patriot Park Soowon.

In December 1942, Haan met with George Atcheson Jr. and Laurence E. Salisbury of the State Department in an effort to obtain a written assurance that the United States would assist in establishing an independent Korean government after the war, which he said would encourage Korean agents in Japanese territory.

On May 5, 1943, Haan appeared before Chairperson Samuel Dickstein’s House Immigration Committee on the repeal of the Chinese Exclusion Law. He gave testimony that his network of spies in East Asia had discovered evidence of the Japanese government's plan to end the war in China and re-deploy its naval assets to convoy a force of over 100,000 seasoned troops to invade Crescent City, California, "before Christmas".

After the war, Haan shifted his focus to campaigning against the expansion of Soviet communism, and passed intelligence to the U.S. government regarding the Sino-Soviet alliance, the Soviet atomic bomb program, and the Korean War.

== Legacy ==
Haan's work was not widely acknowledged until well after his death in 1976.

The South Korean spy thriller film Haan was released in 2005 based on Haan's experience as Korea's first notable double agent. The film follows Haan as he learns of Japan's impending attack on Pearl Harbor in 1941 and tries to warn the United States, but is ignored.

Haan's personal papers can be found in the University of California, Santa Cruz archives.

== Selected publications ==
Books translated

- How Japan Plans to Win. Boston: Little, Brown and Co. (1942). — An English translation of The Three-Power Alliance and a United States-Japanese War (in Japanese), by Kinoaki Matsuo.
