= Haan (film) =

- Hangul: Haan 한길수
- RR: Haan Han Gilsu
- MR: Haan Han Kilsu
- Directed by: Lee In-soo
- Written by: Lee In-soo
- Produced by: Lee In-soo
- Starring: Ahn Jae-mo; Im Yoo-jin; Go Jeong-il
- Cinematography: Choi Geon-hee
- Edited by: Sin Cheol, Song Seong-il
- Music by: Mun Won-gyeong
- Production company: Triumph Pictures
- Distributed by: Media Line Pictures
- Release date: September 23, 2005
- Running time: 92 minutes
- Country: South Korea
- Language: Korean

Haan (Korean: Haan 한길수) is a 2005 South Korean spy thriller film starring Ahn Jae-mo, Im Yoo-jin and Go Jeong-il. Written, directed and produced by Lee In-soo, it is based on the true story of Korea's first double agent, Haan Kil-soo (also known as Kilsoo Haan).

== Plot ==
Kilsoo Haan, Korea's first double agent, learns of Japan's imminent attack on Pearl Harbor in 1941. He tries to warn the US but his warnings are not taken seriously in time.

== Cast ==
- Ahn Jae-mo as Han Gil-soo
- Im Yoo-jin as Nanami/Yoon Ji-in
- Go Jeong-il
- Lee Yeong-seok
- Chris Jackson as Reporter
