= Lee Ji-eun (actress, born 1971) =

South Korean actress (1971–2021)

- 이지은
- Lee in 2003
- Born: 28 August 1971; Seoul, South Korea
- Died: 8 March 2021 (aged 49); Seoul, South Korea
- Occupations: Actress; model
- Years active: 2009–present; 2004
- Spouse: Lee Jin-seong (m. 2000; div. 2015)

Lee Ji-eun (Korean: 이지은; 28 August 1971 – 8 March 2021) was a South Korean former actress and model, mainly active during the 1990s. She was known for playing Cho Hyun-ji in the KBS2 weekend soap opera A Sunny Place of the Young, as well as Emperor of the Sea. Born in 1971, she debuted into the showbusiness in 1994 when she modelled for a program called Good Morning on SBS. She received the 1995 Blue Dragon Film Award for Best New Actress for her performance in the film, My Dear Keum-hong.

Lee was found dead in her home in Seoul on 8 March 2021. An autopsy later revealed the cause of death to be a myocardial infarction, also known as a heart attack.

== Filmography ==
=== Film ===
Year	Title	Role(s)	Notes
1995	My Dear Keum-hong	Keum-hong	
1998	Rub Love	Na-na	
1998	Birdcage Inn	Jin-a	Lead role
1999	Fin de Siècle	So-ryeong	

=== Television series ===
Year	Title	Role(s)	Notes
1994	Good Morning	Herself	Debut appearance; was a model
1994	Feelings	Ju-hee	
1994	Drama Game		Episode 534, "My Love, Michelle"
1995	A Sunny Place for the Young	Cho Hyun-ji	One of the main roles in an ensemble cast
1996	Daughter-in-Law's Three Kingdoms	Michiko	
1996	Colors	Lee Hwa-kyung	Episode 2, "Red" (alternately "Red, Love Alert")
1997	OK Ranch		
1997	Model	A fashion magazine reporter	Minor role
1998	The King and the Queen	Han Myeong-hoe's concubine Hyang-yi	Minor role
1999	KBS Sunday Best	Se-ri	Episode 73, "Se-ri Is Back"
2000	You Don't Know My Mind	Jang Eun-ji	Minor role
2004	Emperor of the Sea		Minor role

== Awards ==
Year	Award	Category	Nominated work	Result
1995	6th Chunsa Film Art Awards	Best New Actress	My Dear Keum-hong	Won
1995	16th Blue Dragon Film Awards	Best New Actress	My Dear Keum-hong	Won
1995	15th Korean Association of Film Critics Awards	Best New Actress	My Dear Keum-hong	Won
1996	34th Grand Bell Awards	Best New Actress	My Dear Keum-hong	Won
