= Kinoaki Matsuo =

Japanese strategist

Kinoaki Matsuo (松尾 樹明, Matsuo Kinoaki) was a Japanese Foreign Affairs Officer and Navy Admiralty Liaison, Black Dragon Society member, writer, and Japanese Navy strategist who wrote How Japan Plans to Win.

== How Japan Plans to Win ==
In 1940, Kinoaki Matsuo published a book on how Japan planned to win a war with the United States. The war would not formally begin for another thirteen months. The Three Power Alliance And The United States-Japanese War, written by Matsuo while he was serving as a liaison between the Japanese Foreign Office and the Admiralty, openly discussed the impending hostilities. He wrote, "...the United States will be obliged to exercise prudence and self- restraint toward Japan at least until 1945. As soon as the great armament expansion is completed, the United States will probably avail herself of the opportunity to declare war upon Japan... then the chances of American victory will be far greater than Japan's". He stated, "Japan is naturally blessed by double defensive walls linked inside and outside by a chain of islands. The inside link consists of the Pescadores Islands, Formosa, all islands to the west and south, the Ogasawara Islands (Bonin), and the Chishima Islands, all of which have already been strongly armed for defense. The outside link (the Japanese South Seas Mandate Islands) extends many thousands of nautical miles embracing the Marshalls, Carolines, Marianas and Pelew (sic) islands, which are scattered like stars across the routes of the United States Navy either perpendicularly or horizontally. The total number of these islands is more than one thousand. It will be impossible for the United States fleet to reach its destination..." Mr. Matsuo continued.

He analyzed the supposed strategical Japanese planning for defeating U.S. Naval forces by suggesting that "the United States fleet in its attempt to cross the Pacific can be imagined by recalling the end of the Russian Baltic Fleet in the Sea of Japan."

In the years prior to the attack on Pearl Harbor on December 7, 1941, Japan constructed an ocean fortress behind a wall of secrecy in violation of its diplomatic agreement with the League. The mandated islands, including the Northern Marianas, were forbidden territory to U.S. ships and American naval authorities were becoming increasingly apprehensive over Japan's rearmament and the growing belligerency of its military, first overtly observed in the USS Panay incident.

Other reports indicated that the previously mentioned book was an important secret Japanese high-level document, and was alleged to have been stolen from Kinoaki Matsuo, a high-ranking officer of the Black Dragon Society by Kilsoo Haan, an anti-Japanese Korean patriot. This document was purported to detail Japanese war plans for the simultaneous invasion of the Panama Canal Zone, Alaska, California and Washington. Haan was said to have obtained the documents by clandestine means in a Los Angeles hotel room in 1940.

The author, Kinoaki Matsuo is described as a Japanese intelligence officer and high official member in the ultranationalist Black Dragon secret society (Kokuryu-Kai or Amur River Society) and an active unit in Japanese Intelligence Service linked with Japanese Navy. Kilsoo Haan was a native of Japanese-occupied Korea and sought the liberation of his homeland.

== Bibliography ==
=== Books ===
- 松尾樹明『三國同盟と日米戰』霞ヶ關書房 1940.10 増補改訂版 (English: The Three-power Alliance and a United States-Japanese War) (Foreign Office Press, 1940)
- How Japan Plans to Win — An English translation of the Japanese book, The Three-Power Alliance and a United States-Japanese War, by Kilsoo K. Haan (Little, Brown & Co., 1942)

=== Reviews by other authors ===
- Chamberlain, William Henry. “A Pep Talk for the Japanese.” Review of How Japan Plans to Win, by Kinoaki Matsuo. The New York Times, April 26, 1942, Section BR, p. 18.
- Woolbert, Robert Gale. Review of How Japan Plans to Win, by Kinoaki Matsuo. Foreign Affairs, Vol. 20, No. 4, July 1942, p. 785.
- Ainger, E. Review of How Japan Plans to Win, by Kinoaki Matsuo. International Affairs Review Supplement, Vol. 19, No. 9, September 1942, pp. 519–520.

== See also ==
- Black Dragon Society
- How Japan Plans to Win (1942)
